

367001–367100 

|-bgcolor=#d6d6d6
| 367001 ||  || — || January 4, 2006 || Catalina || CSS || EUP || align=right | 4.3 km || 
|-id=002 bgcolor=#d6d6d6
| 367002 ||  || — || December 25, 2005 || Mount Lemmon || Mount Lemmon Survey || — || align=right | 2.2 km || 
|-id=003 bgcolor=#E9E9E9
| 367003 ||  || — || January 2, 2006 || Catalina || CSS || — || align=right | 1.6 km || 
|-id=004 bgcolor=#E9E9E9
| 367004 ||  || — || January 7, 2006 || Mount Lemmon || Mount Lemmon Survey || — || align=right | 2.7 km || 
|-id=005 bgcolor=#d6d6d6
| 367005 ||  || — || January 5, 2006 || Kitt Peak || Spacewatch || EOS || align=right | 2.4 km || 
|-id=006 bgcolor=#d6d6d6
| 367006 ||  || — || December 28, 2005 || Kitt Peak || Spacewatch || EOS || align=right | 2.3 km || 
|-id=007 bgcolor=#d6d6d6
| 367007 ||  || — || November 25, 2005 || Mount Lemmon || Mount Lemmon Survey || — || align=right | 3.6 km || 
|-id=008 bgcolor=#d6d6d6
| 367008 ||  || — || January 8, 2006 || Kitt Peak || Spacewatch || — || align=right | 3.3 km || 
|-id=009 bgcolor=#d6d6d6
| 367009 ||  || — || January 8, 2006 || Mount Lemmon || Mount Lemmon Survey || — || align=right | 3.7 km || 
|-id=010 bgcolor=#d6d6d6
| 367010 ||  || — || January 5, 2006 || Mount Lemmon || Mount Lemmon Survey || — || align=right | 2.4 km || 
|-id=011 bgcolor=#d6d6d6
| 367011 ||  || — || January 23, 2006 || Kitt Peak || Spacewatch || — || align=right | 2.5 km || 
|-id=012 bgcolor=#d6d6d6
| 367012 ||  || — || January 23, 2006 || Mount Lemmon || Mount Lemmon Survey || — || align=right | 3.0 km || 
|-id=013 bgcolor=#d6d6d6
| 367013 ||  || — || January 26, 2006 || Kitt Peak || Spacewatch || — || align=right | 2.6 km || 
|-id=014 bgcolor=#d6d6d6
| 367014 ||  || — || January 6, 2006 || Mount Lemmon || Mount Lemmon Survey || — || align=right | 3.9 km || 
|-id=015 bgcolor=#d6d6d6
| 367015 ||  || — || January 23, 2006 || Mount Lemmon || Mount Lemmon Survey || NAE || align=right | 3.2 km || 
|-id=016 bgcolor=#d6d6d6
| 367016 ||  || — || January 25, 2006 || Kitt Peak || Spacewatch || — || align=right | 2.3 km || 
|-id=017 bgcolor=#d6d6d6
| 367017 ||  || — || January 25, 2006 || Kitt Peak || Spacewatch || — || align=right | 2.7 km || 
|-id=018 bgcolor=#d6d6d6
| 367018 ||  || — || January 8, 2006 || Mount Lemmon || Mount Lemmon Survey || — || align=right | 2.8 km || 
|-id=019 bgcolor=#d6d6d6
| 367019 ||  || — || January 26, 2006 || Mount Lemmon || Mount Lemmon Survey || — || align=right | 2.4 km || 
|-id=020 bgcolor=#d6d6d6
| 367020 ||  || — || January 26, 2006 || Kitt Peak || Spacewatch || EOS || align=right | 1.9 km || 
|-id=021 bgcolor=#d6d6d6
| 367021 ||  || — || January 27, 2006 || Mount Lemmon || Mount Lemmon Survey || EOS || align=right | 1.6 km || 
|-id=022 bgcolor=#d6d6d6
| 367022 ||  || — || January 27, 2006 || Kitt Peak || Spacewatch || TRE || align=right | 2.6 km || 
|-id=023 bgcolor=#d6d6d6
| 367023 ||  || — || January 27, 2006 || Mount Lemmon || Mount Lemmon Survey || — || align=right | 3.0 km || 
|-id=024 bgcolor=#fefefe
| 367024 ||  || — || January 30, 2006 || Kitt Peak || Spacewatch || — || align=right data-sort-value="0.76" | 760 m || 
|-id=025 bgcolor=#d6d6d6
| 367025 ||  || — || January 23, 2006 || Mount Lemmon || Mount Lemmon Survey || — || align=right | 2.5 km || 
|-id=026 bgcolor=#d6d6d6
| 367026 ||  || — || January 23, 2006 || Mount Lemmon || Mount Lemmon Survey || — || align=right | 3.6 km || 
|-id=027 bgcolor=#d6d6d6
| 367027 ||  || — || January 23, 2006 || Kitt Peak || Spacewatch || HYG || align=right | 2.9 km || 
|-id=028 bgcolor=#fefefe
| 367028 ||  || — || January 30, 2006 || Kitt Peak || Spacewatch || FLO || align=right data-sort-value="0.49" | 490 m || 
|-id=029 bgcolor=#d6d6d6
| 367029 || 2006 CC || — || February 1, 2006 || 7300 Observatory || W. K. Y. Yeung || — || align=right | 4.3 km || 
|-id=030 bgcolor=#d6d6d6
| 367030 ||  || — || February 4, 2006 || Jornada || D. S. Dixon || — || align=right | 2.3 km || 
|-id=031 bgcolor=#d6d6d6
| 367031 ||  || — || February 1, 2006 || Kitt Peak || Spacewatch || — || align=right | 2.4 km || 
|-id=032 bgcolor=#fefefe
| 367032 ||  || — || February 1, 2006 || Mount Lemmon || Mount Lemmon Survey || — || align=right data-sort-value="0.67" | 670 m || 
|-id=033 bgcolor=#E9E9E9
| 367033 ||  || — || February 6, 2006 || Mount Lemmon || Mount Lemmon Survey || CLO || align=right | 2.1 km || 
|-id=034 bgcolor=#d6d6d6
| 367034 ||  || — || February 3, 2006 || Anderson Mesa || LONEOS || EUP || align=right | 4.1 km || 
|-id=035 bgcolor=#d6d6d6
| 367035 ||  || — || February 20, 2006 || Catalina || CSS || — || align=right | 5.1 km || 
|-id=036 bgcolor=#d6d6d6
| 367036 ||  || — || January 31, 2006 || Kitt Peak || Spacewatch || — || align=right | 2.6 km || 
|-id=037 bgcolor=#fefefe
| 367037 ||  || — || February 24, 2006 || Kitt Peak || Spacewatch || FLO || align=right data-sort-value="0.54" | 540 m || 
|-id=038 bgcolor=#d6d6d6
| 367038 ||  || — || January 30, 2006 || Kitt Peak || Spacewatch || — || align=right | 3.5 km || 
|-id=039 bgcolor=#fefefe
| 367039 ||  || — || February 25, 2006 || Kitt Peak || Spacewatch || — || align=right data-sort-value="0.60" | 600 m || 
|-id=040 bgcolor=#fefefe
| 367040 ||  || — || February 27, 2006 || Mount Lemmon || Mount Lemmon Survey || — || align=right data-sort-value="0.64" | 640 m || 
|-id=041 bgcolor=#d6d6d6
| 367041 ||  || — || January 28, 2006 || Anderson Mesa || LONEOS || LIX || align=right | 4.4 km || 
|-id=042 bgcolor=#fefefe
| 367042 ||  || — || March 2, 2006 || Kitt Peak || Spacewatch || — || align=right data-sort-value="0.67" | 670 m || 
|-id=043 bgcolor=#d6d6d6
| 367043 ||  || — || March 2, 2006 || Kitt Peak || Spacewatch || THM || align=right | 2.6 km || 
|-id=044 bgcolor=#d6d6d6
| 367044 ||  || — || March 2, 2006 || Kitt Peak || Spacewatch || THM || align=right | 2.6 km || 
|-id=045 bgcolor=#d6d6d6
| 367045 ||  || — || March 3, 2006 || Kitt Peak || Spacewatch || — || align=right | 4.3 km || 
|-id=046 bgcolor=#fefefe
| 367046 ||  || — || March 23, 2006 || Kitt Peak || Spacewatch || — || align=right data-sort-value="0.70" | 700 m || 
|-id=047 bgcolor=#fefefe
| 367047 ||  || — || March 26, 2006 || Pla D'Arguines || Pla D'Arguines Obs. || — || align=right data-sort-value="0.73" | 730 m || 
|-id=048 bgcolor=#d6d6d6
| 367048 ||  || — || April 6, 1995 || Kitt Peak || Spacewatch || — || align=right | 3.3 km || 
|-id=049 bgcolor=#d6d6d6
| 367049 ||  || — || April 9, 2006 || Kitt Peak || Spacewatch || — || align=right | 3.0 km || 
|-id=050 bgcolor=#fefefe
| 367050 ||  || — || April 19, 2006 || Kitt Peak || Spacewatch || FLO || align=right data-sort-value="0.67" | 670 m || 
|-id=051 bgcolor=#d6d6d6
| 367051 ||  || — || April 19, 2006 || Kitt Peak || Spacewatch || — || align=right | 2.7 km || 
|-id=052 bgcolor=#fefefe
| 367052 ||  || — || May 3, 2006 || Mount Lemmon || Mount Lemmon Survey || — || align=right data-sort-value="0.65" | 650 m || 
|-id=053 bgcolor=#fefefe
| 367053 ||  || — || May 2, 2006 || Mount Lemmon || Mount Lemmon Survey || V || align=right data-sort-value="0.55" | 550 m || 
|-id=054 bgcolor=#fefefe
| 367054 ||  || — || May 8, 2006 || Mount Lemmon || Mount Lemmon Survey || FLO || align=right data-sort-value="0.61" | 610 m || 
|-id=055 bgcolor=#d6d6d6
| 367055 ||  || — || May 1, 2006 || Kitt Peak || M. W. Buie || — || align=right | 2.2 km || 
|-id=056 bgcolor=#fefefe
| 367056 ||  || — || May 20, 2006 || Kitt Peak || Spacewatch || — || align=right data-sort-value="0.71" | 710 m || 
|-id=057 bgcolor=#fefefe
| 367057 ||  || — || May 20, 2006 || Kitt Peak || Spacewatch || — || align=right data-sort-value="0.64" | 640 m || 
|-id=058 bgcolor=#fefefe
| 367058 ||  || — || May 21, 2006 || Kitt Peak || Spacewatch || FLO || align=right data-sort-value="0.56" | 560 m || 
|-id=059 bgcolor=#fefefe
| 367059 ||  || — || May 21, 2006 || Kitt Peak || Spacewatch || — || align=right data-sort-value="0.77" | 770 m || 
|-id=060 bgcolor=#fefefe
| 367060 ||  || — || May 21, 2006 || Kitt Peak || Spacewatch || — || align=right data-sort-value="0.64" | 640 m || 
|-id=061 bgcolor=#d6d6d6
| 367061 ||  || — || May 22, 2006 || Kitt Peak || Spacewatch || 7:4 || align=right | 4.1 km || 
|-id=062 bgcolor=#fefefe
| 367062 ||  || — || May 24, 2006 || Kitt Peak || Spacewatch || — || align=right data-sort-value="0.51" | 510 m || 
|-id=063 bgcolor=#fefefe
| 367063 ||  || — || June 17, 2006 || Kitt Peak || Spacewatch || FLO || align=right data-sort-value="0.74" | 740 m || 
|-id=064 bgcolor=#fefefe
| 367064 ||  || — || June 18, 2006 || Kitt Peak || Spacewatch || — || align=right | 1.1 km || 
|-id=065 bgcolor=#fefefe
| 367065 ||  || — || June 21, 2006 || Kitt Peak || Spacewatch || NYS || align=right data-sort-value="0.70" | 700 m || 
|-id=066 bgcolor=#fefefe
| 367066 ||  || — || July 25, 2006 || Ottmarsheim || C. Rinner || — || align=right data-sort-value="0.81" | 810 m || 
|-id=067 bgcolor=#fefefe
| 367067 ||  || — || July 31, 2006 || Siding Spring || SSS || — || align=right data-sort-value="0.87" | 870 m || 
|-id=068 bgcolor=#fefefe
| 367068 ||  || — || August 12, 2006 || Lulin Observatory || H.-C. Lin, Q.-z. Ye || — || align=right data-sort-value="0.92" | 920 m || 
|-id=069 bgcolor=#fefefe
| 367069 ||  || — || August 13, 2006 || Palomar || NEAT || FLO || align=right data-sort-value="0.73" | 730 m || 
|-id=070 bgcolor=#fefefe
| 367070 ||  || — || August 13, 2006 || Palomar || NEAT || NYS || align=right data-sort-value="0.57" | 570 m || 
|-id=071 bgcolor=#fefefe
| 367071 ||  || — || August 15, 2006 || Palomar || NEAT || NYS || align=right data-sort-value="0.58" | 580 m || 
|-id=072 bgcolor=#fefefe
| 367072 ||  || — || August 13, 2006 || Palomar || NEAT || NYS || align=right data-sort-value="0.72" | 720 m || 
|-id=073 bgcolor=#FA8072
| 367073 ||  || — || August 14, 2006 || Palomar || NEAT || — || align=right | 1.1 km || 
|-id=074 bgcolor=#fefefe
| 367074 ||  || — || August 15, 2006 || Palomar || NEAT || ERI || align=right | 1.6 km || 
|-id=075 bgcolor=#fefefe
| 367075 ||  || — || August 15, 2006 || Palomar || NEAT || NYS || align=right data-sort-value="0.82" | 820 m || 
|-id=076 bgcolor=#fefefe
| 367076 ||  || — || August 13, 2006 || Palomar || NEAT || NYS || align=right data-sort-value="0.79" | 790 m || 
|-id=077 bgcolor=#fefefe
| 367077 ||  || — || August 15, 2006 || Siding Spring || SSS || PHO || align=right | 1.2 km || 
|-id=078 bgcolor=#fefefe
| 367078 ||  || — || August 12, 2006 || Palomar || NEAT || NYS || align=right data-sort-value="0.62" | 620 m || 
|-id=079 bgcolor=#fefefe
| 367079 ||  || — || August 17, 2006 || Palomar || NEAT || NYS || align=right data-sort-value="0.72" | 720 m || 
|-id=080 bgcolor=#fefefe
| 367080 ||  || — || August 19, 2006 || Pla D'Arguines || R. Ferrando || NYS || align=right data-sort-value="0.78" | 780 m || 
|-id=081 bgcolor=#fefefe
| 367081 ||  || — || August 17, 2006 || Palomar || NEAT || — || align=right data-sort-value="0.89" | 890 m || 
|-id=082 bgcolor=#E9E9E9
| 367082 ||  || — || August 19, 2006 || Kitt Peak || Spacewatch || — || align=right | 3.0 km || 
|-id=083 bgcolor=#fefefe
| 367083 ||  || — || July 21, 2006 || Mount Lemmon || Mount Lemmon Survey || — || align=right | 1.0 km || 
|-id=084 bgcolor=#fefefe
| 367084 ||  || — || May 26, 2006 || Mount Lemmon || Mount Lemmon Survey || — || align=right data-sort-value="0.94" | 940 m || 
|-id=085 bgcolor=#fefefe
| 367085 ||  || — || May 26, 2006 || Mount Lemmon || Mount Lemmon Survey || FLO || align=right data-sort-value="0.75" | 750 m || 
|-id=086 bgcolor=#fefefe
| 367086 ||  || — || August 17, 2006 || Palomar || NEAT || ERI || align=right | 1.9 km || 
|-id=087 bgcolor=#fefefe
| 367087 ||  || — || August 18, 2006 || Kitt Peak || Spacewatch || — || align=right | 1.8 km || 
|-id=088 bgcolor=#fefefe
| 367088 ||  || — || August 23, 2006 || Palomar || NEAT || MAS || align=right data-sort-value="0.66" | 660 m || 
|-id=089 bgcolor=#d6d6d6
| 367089 ||  || — || August 24, 2006 || Socorro || LINEAR || HIL3:2 || align=right | 6.4 km || 
|-id=090 bgcolor=#fefefe
| 367090 ||  || — || July 21, 2006 || Catalina || CSS || FLO || align=right data-sort-value="0.84" | 840 m || 
|-id=091 bgcolor=#fefefe
| 367091 ||  || — || August 16, 2006 || Palomar || NEAT || — || align=right data-sort-value="0.87" | 870 m || 
|-id=092 bgcolor=#fefefe
| 367092 ||  || — || August 19, 2006 || Kitt Peak || Spacewatch || NYS || align=right data-sort-value="0.72" | 720 m || 
|-id=093 bgcolor=#fefefe
| 367093 ||  || — || August 23, 2006 || Palomar || NEAT || — || align=right | 1.1 km || 
|-id=094 bgcolor=#fefefe
| 367094 ||  || — || August 22, 2006 || Palomar || NEAT || V || align=right data-sort-value="0.58" | 580 m || 
|-id=095 bgcolor=#fefefe
| 367095 ||  || — || August 29, 2006 || Catalina || CSS || FLO || align=right data-sort-value="0.74" | 740 m || 
|-id=096 bgcolor=#fefefe
| 367096 ||  || — || August 27, 2006 || Anderson Mesa || LONEOS || V || align=right data-sort-value="0.73" | 730 m || 
|-id=097 bgcolor=#fefefe
| 367097 ||  || — || August 28, 2006 || Anderson Mesa || LONEOS || — || align=right data-sort-value="0.85" | 850 m || 
|-id=098 bgcolor=#fefefe
| 367098 ||  || — || September 12, 2006 || Catalina || CSS || — || align=right data-sort-value="0.86" | 860 m || 
|-id=099 bgcolor=#fefefe
| 367099 ||  || — || September 14, 2006 || Kitt Peak || Spacewatch || NYS || align=right data-sort-value="0.76" | 760 m || 
|-id=100 bgcolor=#fefefe
| 367100 ||  || — || September 13, 2006 || Palomar || NEAT || — || align=right | 1.0 km || 
|}

367101–367200 

|-bgcolor=#d6d6d6
| 367101 ||  || — || September 13, 2006 || Palomar || NEAT || 3:2 || align=right | 5.3 km || 
|-id=102 bgcolor=#fefefe
| 367102 ||  || — || September 14, 2006 || Palomar || NEAT || NYS || align=right data-sort-value="0.65" | 650 m || 
|-id=103 bgcolor=#fefefe
| 367103 ||  || — || September 15, 2006 || Kitt Peak || Spacewatch || NYS || align=right data-sort-value="0.68" | 680 m || 
|-id=104 bgcolor=#fefefe
| 367104 ||  || — || September 15, 2006 || Kitt Peak || Spacewatch || MAS || align=right data-sort-value="0.70" | 700 m || 
|-id=105 bgcolor=#fefefe
| 367105 ||  || — || September 14, 2006 || Mayhill || A. Lowe || — || align=right | 1.1 km || 
|-id=106 bgcolor=#fefefe
| 367106 ||  || — || September 15, 2006 || Kitt Peak || Spacewatch || — || align=right | 1.0 km || 
|-id=107 bgcolor=#fefefe
| 367107 ||  || — || September 13, 2006 || Palomar || NEAT || MAS || align=right data-sort-value="0.94" | 940 m || 
|-id=108 bgcolor=#fefefe
| 367108 ||  || — || September 14, 2006 || Kitt Peak || Spacewatch || — || align=right data-sort-value="0.52" | 520 m || 
|-id=109 bgcolor=#fefefe
| 367109 ||  || — || September 15, 2006 || Kitt Peak || Spacewatch || — || align=right data-sort-value="0.70" | 700 m || 
|-id=110 bgcolor=#fefefe
| 367110 ||  || — || September 15, 2006 || Kitt Peak || Spacewatch || NYS || align=right data-sort-value="0.59" | 590 m || 
|-id=111 bgcolor=#fefefe
| 367111 ||  || — || September 17, 2006 || Kitt Peak || Spacewatch || NYS || align=right data-sort-value="0.76" | 760 m || 
|-id=112 bgcolor=#fefefe
| 367112 ||  || — || September 16, 2006 || Catalina || CSS || FLO || align=right data-sort-value="0.56" | 560 m || 
|-id=113 bgcolor=#fefefe
| 367113 ||  || — || September 16, 2006 || Catalina || CSS || V || align=right data-sort-value="0.74" | 740 m || 
|-id=114 bgcolor=#fefefe
| 367114 ||  || — || September 17, 2006 || Kitt Peak || Spacewatch || — || align=right data-sort-value="0.79" | 790 m || 
|-id=115 bgcolor=#fefefe
| 367115 ||  || — || September 19, 2006 || Anderson Mesa || LONEOS || — || align=right data-sort-value="0.85" | 850 m || 
|-id=116 bgcolor=#fefefe
| 367116 ||  || — || September 17, 2006 || Kitt Peak || Spacewatch || V || align=right data-sort-value="0.65" | 650 m || 
|-id=117 bgcolor=#fefefe
| 367117 ||  || — || July 21, 2006 || Mount Lemmon || Mount Lemmon Survey || — || align=right data-sort-value="0.75" | 750 m || 
|-id=118 bgcolor=#d6d6d6
| 367118 ||  || — || September 19, 2006 || Kitt Peak || Spacewatch || SHU3:2 || align=right | 6.7 km || 
|-id=119 bgcolor=#fefefe
| 367119 ||  || — || September 18, 2006 || Kitt Peak || Spacewatch || MAS || align=right data-sort-value="0.69" | 690 m || 
|-id=120 bgcolor=#fefefe
| 367120 ||  || — || September 18, 2006 || Kitt Peak || Spacewatch || MAS || align=right data-sort-value="0.78" | 780 m || 
|-id=121 bgcolor=#fefefe
| 367121 ||  || — || September 19, 2006 || Kitt Peak || Spacewatch || NYS || align=right data-sort-value="0.63" | 630 m || 
|-id=122 bgcolor=#d6d6d6
| 367122 ||  || — || September 17, 2006 || Kitt Peak || Spacewatch || SHU3:2 || align=right | 6.4 km || 
|-id=123 bgcolor=#fefefe
| 367123 ||  || — || August 29, 2006 || Anderson Mesa || LONEOS || — || align=right data-sort-value="0.89" | 890 m || 
|-id=124 bgcolor=#fefefe
| 367124 ||  || — || September 25, 2006 || Eskridge || Farpoint Obs. || MAS || align=right data-sort-value="0.61" | 610 m || 
|-id=125 bgcolor=#fefefe
| 367125 ||  || — || September 19, 2006 || Kitt Peak || Spacewatch || — || align=right | 1.0 km || 
|-id=126 bgcolor=#fefefe
| 367126 ||  || — || September 18, 2006 || Kitt Peak || Spacewatch || EUT || align=right data-sort-value="0.63" | 630 m || 
|-id=127 bgcolor=#d6d6d6
| 367127 ||  || — || September 25, 2006 || Kitt Peak || Spacewatch || 3:2 || align=right | 5.2 km || 
|-id=128 bgcolor=#d6d6d6
| 367128 ||  || — || September 26, 2006 || Mount Lemmon || Mount Lemmon Survey || 3:2 || align=right | 4.7 km || 
|-id=129 bgcolor=#fefefe
| 367129 ||  || — || September 27, 2006 || Mount Lemmon || Mount Lemmon Survey || NYS || align=right data-sort-value="0.86" | 860 m || 
|-id=130 bgcolor=#fefefe
| 367130 ||  || — || September 17, 2006 || Kitt Peak || Spacewatch || MAS || align=right data-sort-value="0.90" | 900 m || 
|-id=131 bgcolor=#fefefe
| 367131 ||  || — || September 30, 2006 || Catalina || CSS || — || align=right data-sort-value="0.96" | 960 m || 
|-id=132 bgcolor=#fefefe
| 367132 ||  || — || September 30, 2006 || Mount Lemmon || Mount Lemmon Survey || NYS || align=right data-sort-value="0.73" | 730 m || 
|-id=133 bgcolor=#fefefe
| 367133 ||  || — || September 28, 2006 || Catalina || CSS || — || align=right | 1.1 km || 
|-id=134 bgcolor=#fefefe
| 367134 ||  || — || October 11, 2006 || Palomar || NEAT || H || align=right data-sort-value="0.78" | 780 m || 
|-id=135 bgcolor=#d6d6d6
| 367135 ||  || — || October 12, 2006 || Kitt Peak || Spacewatch || SHU3:2 || align=right | 6.0 km || 
|-id=136 bgcolor=#fefefe
| 367136 ||  || — || October 12, 2006 || Kitt Peak || Spacewatch || MAS || align=right data-sort-value="0.60" | 600 m || 
|-id=137 bgcolor=#fefefe
| 367137 ||  || — || October 12, 2006 || Kitt Peak || Spacewatch || NYS || align=right data-sort-value="0.79" | 790 m || 
|-id=138 bgcolor=#fefefe
| 367138 ||  || — || October 12, 2006 || Kitt Peak || Spacewatch || — || align=right data-sort-value="0.85" | 850 m || 
|-id=139 bgcolor=#d6d6d6
| 367139 ||  || — || October 11, 2006 || Palomar || NEAT || SHU3:2 || align=right | 6.5 km || 
|-id=140 bgcolor=#fefefe
| 367140 ||  || — || October 4, 2006 || Mount Lemmon || Mount Lemmon Survey || V || align=right data-sort-value="0.63" | 630 m || 
|-id=141 bgcolor=#fefefe
| 367141 ||  || — || October 12, 2006 || Kitt Peak || Spacewatch || H || align=right data-sort-value="0.58" | 580 m || 
|-id=142 bgcolor=#E9E9E9
| 367142 ||  || — || October 12, 2006 || Palomar || NEAT || IAN || align=right | 1.2 km || 
|-id=143 bgcolor=#fefefe
| 367143 ||  || — || October 15, 2006 || Kitt Peak || Spacewatch || NYS || align=right data-sort-value="0.67" | 670 m || 
|-id=144 bgcolor=#E9E9E9
| 367144 ||  || — || October 16, 2006 || Kitt Peak || Spacewatch || — || align=right data-sort-value="0.96" | 960 m || 
|-id=145 bgcolor=#fefefe
| 367145 ||  || — || September 30, 2006 || Mount Lemmon || Mount Lemmon Survey || NYS || align=right data-sort-value="0.69" | 690 m || 
|-id=146 bgcolor=#fefefe
| 367146 ||  || — || September 17, 2006 || Catalina || CSS || V || align=right data-sort-value="0.85" | 850 m || 
|-id=147 bgcolor=#fefefe
| 367147 ||  || — || August 29, 2006 || Catalina || CSS || — || align=right data-sort-value="0.84" | 840 m || 
|-id=148 bgcolor=#fefefe
| 367148 ||  || — || October 16, 2006 || Kitt Peak || Spacewatch || — || align=right data-sort-value="0.74" | 740 m || 
|-id=149 bgcolor=#fefefe
| 367149 ||  || — || October 16, 2006 || Catalina || CSS || — || align=right data-sort-value="0.88" | 880 m || 
|-id=150 bgcolor=#fefefe
| 367150 ||  || — || October 18, 2006 || Kitt Peak || Spacewatch || NYS || align=right data-sort-value="0.79" | 790 m || 
|-id=151 bgcolor=#E9E9E9
| 367151 ||  || — || October 19, 2006 || Kitt Peak || Spacewatch || — || align=right | 1.4 km || 
|-id=152 bgcolor=#fefefe
| 367152 ||  || — || October 19, 2006 || Palomar || NEAT || ERI || align=right | 1.5 km || 
|-id=153 bgcolor=#fefefe
| 367153 ||  || — || October 21, 2006 || Catalina || CSS || NYS || align=right data-sort-value="0.57" | 570 m || 
|-id=154 bgcolor=#fefefe
| 367154 ||  || — || October 21, 2006 || Palomar || NEAT || — || align=right data-sort-value="0.80" | 800 m || 
|-id=155 bgcolor=#E9E9E9
| 367155 ||  || — || September 14, 2006 || Kitt Peak || Spacewatch || — || align=right | 1.1 km || 
|-id=156 bgcolor=#E9E9E9
| 367156 ||  || — || October 27, 2006 || Mount Lemmon || Mount Lemmon Survey || — || align=right | 1.0 km || 
|-id=157 bgcolor=#E9E9E9
| 367157 ||  || — || September 27, 2006 || Mount Lemmon || Mount Lemmon Survey || — || align=right | 1.1 km || 
|-id=158 bgcolor=#fefefe
| 367158 ||  || — || November 10, 2006 || Kitt Peak || Spacewatch || MAS || align=right data-sort-value="0.77" | 770 m || 
|-id=159 bgcolor=#fefefe
| 367159 ||  || — || November 10, 2006 || Kitt Peak || Spacewatch || NYS || align=right data-sort-value="0.78" | 780 m || 
|-id=160 bgcolor=#E9E9E9
| 367160 ||  || — || October 27, 2006 || Mount Lemmon || Mount Lemmon Survey || — || align=right | 1.1 km || 
|-id=161 bgcolor=#E9E9E9
| 367161 ||  || — || November 13, 2006 || Kitt Peak || Spacewatch || — || align=right | 3.2 km || 
|-id=162 bgcolor=#fefefe
| 367162 ||  || — || November 11, 2006 || Catalina || CSS || MAS || align=right data-sort-value="0.75" | 750 m || 
|-id=163 bgcolor=#E9E9E9
| 367163 ||  || — || September 28, 2006 || Mount Lemmon || Mount Lemmon Survey || — || align=right | 1.1 km || 
|-id=164 bgcolor=#E9E9E9
| 367164 ||  || — || November 14, 2006 || Kitt Peak || Spacewatch || — || align=right | 1.5 km || 
|-id=165 bgcolor=#E9E9E9
| 367165 ||  || — || November 1, 2006 || Mount Lemmon || Mount Lemmon Survey || — || align=right data-sort-value="0.98" | 980 m || 
|-id=166 bgcolor=#E9E9E9
| 367166 ||  || — || November 16, 2006 || Kitt Peak || Spacewatch || EUN || align=right | 1.8 km || 
|-id=167 bgcolor=#E9E9E9
| 367167 ||  || — || October 22, 2006 || Mount Lemmon || Mount Lemmon Survey || — || align=right | 1.1 km || 
|-id=168 bgcolor=#E9E9E9
| 367168 ||  || — || November 18, 2006 || Socorro || LINEAR || — || align=right | 3.5 km || 
|-id=169 bgcolor=#E9E9E9
| 367169 ||  || — || November 21, 2006 || Mount Lemmon || Mount Lemmon Survey || — || align=right | 2.2 km || 
|-id=170 bgcolor=#E9E9E9
| 367170 ||  || — || November 23, 2006 || Mount Lemmon || Mount Lemmon Survey || — || align=right | 1.8 km || 
|-id=171 bgcolor=#E9E9E9
| 367171 ||  || — || November 21, 2006 || Mount Lemmon || Mount Lemmon Survey || — || align=right | 1.5 km || 
|-id=172 bgcolor=#E9E9E9
| 367172 ||  || — || December 7, 2006 || Palomar || NEAT || — || align=right | 1.1 km || 
|-id=173 bgcolor=#E9E9E9
| 367173 ||  || — || December 10, 2006 || Kitt Peak || Spacewatch || — || align=right | 1.1 km || 
|-id=174 bgcolor=#E9E9E9
| 367174 ||  || — || December 11, 2006 || Kitt Peak || Spacewatch || — || align=right | 1.2 km || 
|-id=175 bgcolor=#E9E9E9
| 367175 ||  || — || December 12, 2006 || Mount Lemmon || Mount Lemmon Survey || — || align=right | 1.3 km || 
|-id=176 bgcolor=#d6d6d6
| 367176 ||  || — || December 12, 2006 || Mount Lemmon || Mount Lemmon Survey || — || align=right | 3.8 km || 
|-id=177 bgcolor=#fefefe
| 367177 ||  || — || December 13, 2006 || Kitt Peak || Spacewatch || V || align=right data-sort-value="0.95" | 950 m || 
|-id=178 bgcolor=#E9E9E9
| 367178 ||  || — || December 11, 2006 || Kitt Peak || Spacewatch || PAD || align=right | 2.0 km || 
|-id=179 bgcolor=#E9E9E9
| 367179 ||  || — || December 1, 2006 || Mount Lemmon || Mount Lemmon Survey || — || align=right | 1.3 km || 
|-id=180 bgcolor=#E9E9E9
| 367180 ||  || — || December 15, 2006 || Mount Lemmon || Mount Lemmon Survey || — || align=right | 1.1 km || 
|-id=181 bgcolor=#fefefe
| 367181 ||  || — || December 16, 2006 || Kitt Peak || Spacewatch || — || align=right data-sort-value="0.82" | 820 m || 
|-id=182 bgcolor=#E9E9E9
| 367182 ||  || — || December 20, 2006 || Palomar || NEAT || MAR || align=right | 1.4 km || 
|-id=183 bgcolor=#FA8072
| 367183 ||  || — || December 21, 2006 || Kitt Peak || Spacewatch || H || align=right data-sort-value="0.62" | 620 m || 
|-id=184 bgcolor=#E9E9E9
| 367184 ||  || — || November 15, 2006 || Mount Lemmon || Mount Lemmon Survey || — || align=right | 3.0 km || 
|-id=185 bgcolor=#E9E9E9
| 367185 ||  || — || December 21, 2006 || Kitt Peak || Spacewatch || — || align=right | 1.6 km || 
|-id=186 bgcolor=#E9E9E9
| 367186 ||  || — || December 21, 2006 || Kitt Peak || Spacewatch || — || align=right data-sort-value="0.84" | 840 m || 
|-id=187 bgcolor=#E9E9E9
| 367187 ||  || — || November 21, 2006 || Mount Lemmon || Mount Lemmon Survey || — || align=right | 2.6 km || 
|-id=188 bgcolor=#E9E9E9
| 367188 ||  || — || December 23, 2006 || Piszkéstető || K. Sárneczky || — || align=right | 2.6 km || 
|-id=189 bgcolor=#E9E9E9
| 367189 ||  || — || November 18, 2006 || Mount Lemmon || Mount Lemmon Survey || — || align=right | 2.3 km || 
|-id=190 bgcolor=#E9E9E9
| 367190 ||  || — || December 24, 2006 || Mount Lemmon || Mount Lemmon Survey || — || align=right | 2.4 km || 
|-id=191 bgcolor=#fefefe
| 367191 ||  || — || January 9, 2007 || Palomar || NEAT || H || align=right data-sort-value="0.84" | 840 m || 
|-id=192 bgcolor=#E9E9E9
| 367192 ||  || — || November 28, 2006 || Mount Lemmon || Mount Lemmon Survey || — || align=right | 1.2 km || 
|-id=193 bgcolor=#fefefe
| 367193 ||  || — || January 15, 2007 || Anderson Mesa || LONEOS || H || align=right data-sort-value="0.82" | 820 m || 
|-id=194 bgcolor=#E9E9E9
| 367194 ||  || — || January 15, 2007 || Anderson Mesa || LONEOS || HNS || align=right | 1.7 km || 
|-id=195 bgcolor=#E9E9E9
| 367195 ||  || — || November 21, 2006 || Mount Lemmon || Mount Lemmon Survey || — || align=right | 2.9 km || 
|-id=196 bgcolor=#E9E9E9
| 367196 ||  || — || January 10, 2007 || Mount Lemmon || Mount Lemmon Survey || MAR || align=right | 1.3 km || 
|-id=197 bgcolor=#E9E9E9
| 367197 ||  || — || January 21, 2007 || Great Shefford || P. Birtwhistle || — || align=right | 1.2 km || 
|-id=198 bgcolor=#E9E9E9
| 367198 ||  || — || January 17, 2007 || Kitt Peak || Spacewatch || — || align=right | 1.7 km || 
|-id=199 bgcolor=#E9E9E9
| 367199 ||  || — || January 17, 2007 || Palomar || NEAT || — || align=right | 1.0 km || 
|-id=200 bgcolor=#E9E9E9
| 367200 ||  || — || January 17, 2007 || Palomar || NEAT || — || align=right | 1.5 km || 
|}

367201–367300 

|-bgcolor=#E9E9E9
| 367201 ||  || — || January 27, 2007 || Mount Lemmon || Mount Lemmon Survey || — || align=right | 1.8 km || 
|-id=202 bgcolor=#E9E9E9
| 367202 ||  || — || February 6, 2007 || Mount Lemmon || Mount Lemmon Survey || PAD || align=right | 1.7 km || 
|-id=203 bgcolor=#E9E9E9
| 367203 ||  || — || December 24, 2006 || Kitt Peak || Spacewatch || GEF || align=right | 1.2 km || 
|-id=204 bgcolor=#E9E9E9
| 367204 ||  || — || February 6, 2007 || Mount Lemmon || Mount Lemmon Survey || — || align=right | 2.7 km || 
|-id=205 bgcolor=#E9E9E9
| 367205 ||  || — || November 27, 2006 || Mount Lemmon || Mount Lemmon Survey || — || align=right | 1.9 km || 
|-id=206 bgcolor=#E9E9E9
| 367206 ||  || — || February 13, 2007 || Mount Lemmon || Mount Lemmon Survey || AER || align=right | 1.5 km || 
|-id=207 bgcolor=#E9E9E9
| 367207 ||  || — || September 1, 2005 || Palomar || NEAT || — || align=right | 2.4 km || 
|-id=208 bgcolor=#E9E9E9
| 367208 ||  || — || February 17, 2007 || Kitt Peak || Spacewatch || — || align=right | 1.3 km || 
|-id=209 bgcolor=#E9E9E9
| 367209 ||  || — || December 27, 2006 || Mount Lemmon || Mount Lemmon Survey || AGN || align=right | 1.3 km || 
|-id=210 bgcolor=#E9E9E9
| 367210 ||  || — || March 24, 2003 || Kitt Peak || Spacewatch || — || align=right | 2.4 km || 
|-id=211 bgcolor=#E9E9E9
| 367211 ||  || — || February 17, 2007 || Kitt Peak || Spacewatch || — || align=right | 2.2 km || 
|-id=212 bgcolor=#E9E9E9
| 367212 ||  || — || February 21, 2007 || Mount Lemmon || Mount Lemmon Survey || — || align=right | 2.7 km || 
|-id=213 bgcolor=#E9E9E9
| 367213 ||  || — || February 21, 2007 || Kitt Peak || Spacewatch || WIT || align=right | 1.0 km || 
|-id=214 bgcolor=#E9E9E9
| 367214 ||  || — || February 23, 2007 || Mount Lemmon || Mount Lemmon Survey || — || align=right | 2.5 km || 
|-id=215 bgcolor=#d6d6d6
| 367215 ||  || — || February 21, 2007 || Mount Lemmon || Mount Lemmon Survey || — || align=right | 2.6 km || 
|-id=216 bgcolor=#d6d6d6
| 367216 ||  || — || March 9, 2007 || Palomar || NEAT || — || align=right | 3.2 km || 
|-id=217 bgcolor=#d6d6d6
| 367217 ||  || — || March 9, 2007 || Kitt Peak || Spacewatch || — || align=right | 2.6 km || 
|-id=218 bgcolor=#d6d6d6
| 367218 ||  || — || March 9, 2007 || Mount Lemmon || Mount Lemmon Survey || — || align=right | 2.4 km || 
|-id=219 bgcolor=#d6d6d6
| 367219 ||  || — || March 10, 2007 || Kitt Peak || Spacewatch || — || align=right | 3.4 km || 
|-id=220 bgcolor=#E9E9E9
| 367220 ||  || — || March 14, 2007 || Mount Lemmon || Mount Lemmon Survey || BAR || align=right | 1.6 km || 
|-id=221 bgcolor=#d6d6d6
| 367221 ||  || — || March 10, 2007 || Kitt Peak || Spacewatch || K-2 || align=right | 1.9 km || 
|-id=222 bgcolor=#E9E9E9
| 367222 ||  || — || March 12, 2007 || Mount Lemmon || Mount Lemmon Survey || WIT || align=right data-sort-value="0.88" | 880 m || 
|-id=223 bgcolor=#d6d6d6
| 367223 ||  || — || March 14, 2007 || Kitt Peak || Spacewatch || — || align=right | 4.2 km || 
|-id=224 bgcolor=#d6d6d6
| 367224 ||  || — || March 12, 2007 || Catalina || CSS || EUP || align=right | 4.9 km || 
|-id=225 bgcolor=#d6d6d6
| 367225 ||  || — || March 15, 2007 || Kitt Peak || Spacewatch || — || align=right | 2.7 km || 
|-id=226 bgcolor=#d6d6d6
| 367226 ||  || — || February 26, 2007 || Mount Lemmon || Mount Lemmon Survey || THM || align=right | 2.4 km || 
|-id=227 bgcolor=#E9E9E9
| 367227 ||  || — || March 16, 2007 || Mount Lemmon || Mount Lemmon Survey || NEM || align=right | 2.2 km || 
|-id=228 bgcolor=#d6d6d6
| 367228 ||  || — || April 11, 2007 || Gaisberg || R. Gierlinger || — || align=right | 3.7 km || 
|-id=229 bgcolor=#d6d6d6
| 367229 ||  || — || April 11, 2007 || Kitt Peak || Spacewatch || — || align=right | 2.8 km || 
|-id=230 bgcolor=#E9E9E9
| 367230 ||  || — || February 21, 2007 || Kitt Peak || Spacewatch || HOF || align=right | 2.5 km || 
|-id=231 bgcolor=#d6d6d6
| 367231 ||  || — || March 13, 2007 || Mount Lemmon || Mount Lemmon Survey || — || align=right | 3.2 km || 
|-id=232 bgcolor=#d6d6d6
| 367232 ||  || — || April 20, 2007 || Kitt Peak || Spacewatch || — || align=right | 4.0 km || 
|-id=233 bgcolor=#d6d6d6
| 367233 ||  || — || January 28, 2007 || Kitt Peak || Spacewatch || — || align=right | 2.9 km || 
|-id=234 bgcolor=#d6d6d6
| 367234 ||  || — || April 20, 2007 || Kitt Peak || Spacewatch || EUP || align=right | 8.6 km || 
|-id=235 bgcolor=#d6d6d6
| 367235 ||  || — || April 22, 2007 || Kitt Peak || Spacewatch || — || align=right | 2.5 km || 
|-id=236 bgcolor=#d6d6d6
| 367236 ||  || — || April 22, 2007 || Mount Lemmon || Mount Lemmon Survey || — || align=right | 4.0 km || 
|-id=237 bgcolor=#d6d6d6
| 367237 ||  || — || April 24, 2007 || Kitt Peak || Spacewatch || — || align=right | 2.5 km || 
|-id=238 bgcolor=#d6d6d6
| 367238 ||  || — || April 24, 2007 || Mount Lemmon || Mount Lemmon Survey || ALA || align=right | 3.5 km || 
|-id=239 bgcolor=#d6d6d6
| 367239 ||  || — || May 7, 2007 || Kitt Peak || Spacewatch || LIX || align=right | 3.2 km || 
|-id=240 bgcolor=#d6d6d6
| 367240 ||  || — || May 8, 2007 || Kitt Peak || Spacewatch || — || align=right | 3.7 km || 
|-id=241 bgcolor=#d6d6d6
| 367241 ||  || — || May 9, 2007 || Kitt Peak || Spacewatch || — || align=right | 2.5 km || 
|-id=242 bgcolor=#d6d6d6
| 367242 ||  || — || May 15, 2007 || Kitt Peak || Spacewatch || CHA || align=right | 2.2 km || 
|-id=243 bgcolor=#d6d6d6
| 367243 ||  || — || April 25, 2007 || Mount Lemmon || Mount Lemmon Survey || — || align=right | 2.6 km || 
|-id=244 bgcolor=#d6d6d6
| 367244 ||  || — || June 8, 2007 || Kitt Peak || Spacewatch || HYG || align=right | 2.7 km || 
|-id=245 bgcolor=#d6d6d6
| 367245 ||  || — || June 8, 2007 || Kitt Peak || Spacewatch || HYG || align=right | 3.0 km || 
|-id=246 bgcolor=#E9E9E9
| 367246 ||  || — || June 9, 2007 || Kitt Peak || Spacewatch || ADE || align=right | 3.4 km || 
|-id=247 bgcolor=#d6d6d6
| 367247 ||  || — || June 17, 2007 || Kitt Peak || Spacewatch || — || align=right | 2.8 km || 
|-id=248 bgcolor=#FFC2E0
| 367248 ||  || — || June 21, 2007 || Catalina || CSS || APOPHAcritical || align=right data-sort-value="0.39" | 390 m || 
|-id=249 bgcolor=#d6d6d6
| 367249 ||  || — || August 12, 2007 || San Marcello || Pistoia Mountains Obs. || SYL7:4 || align=right | 6.2 km || 
|-id=250 bgcolor=#E9E9E9
| 367250 ||  || — || August 10, 2007 || Kitt Peak || Spacewatch || — || align=right | 2.9 km || 
|-id=251 bgcolor=#FA8072
| 367251 ||  || — || August 10, 2007 || Kitt Peak || Spacewatch || — || align=right data-sort-value="0.50" | 500 m || 
|-id=252 bgcolor=#fefefe
| 367252 ||  || — || September 6, 2007 || Anderson Mesa || LONEOS || — || align=right data-sort-value="0.72" | 720 m || 
|-id=253 bgcolor=#d6d6d6
| 367253 ||  || — || September 10, 2007 || Mount Lemmon || Mount Lemmon Survey || EOS || align=right | 2.2 km || 
|-id=254 bgcolor=#fefefe
| 367254 ||  || — || August 11, 2007 || Socorro || LINEAR || FLO || align=right data-sort-value="0.64" | 640 m || 
|-id=255 bgcolor=#fefefe
| 367255 ||  || — || September 10, 2007 || Kitt Peak || Spacewatch || FLO || align=right data-sort-value="0.73" | 730 m || 
|-id=256 bgcolor=#fefefe
| 367256 ||  || — || September 11, 2007 || Kitt Peak || Spacewatch || — || align=right data-sort-value="0.64" | 640 m || 
|-id=257 bgcolor=#d6d6d6
| 367257 ||  || — || September 15, 2007 || Mount Lemmon || Mount Lemmon Survey || URS || align=right | 4.2 km || 
|-id=258 bgcolor=#fefefe
| 367258 ||  || — || September 15, 2007 || Mount Lemmon || Mount Lemmon Survey || — || align=right data-sort-value="0.67" | 670 m || 
|-id=259 bgcolor=#fefefe
| 367259 ||  || — || September 10, 2007 || Mount Lemmon || Mount Lemmon Survey || — || align=right data-sort-value="0.60" | 600 m || 
|-id=260 bgcolor=#fefefe
| 367260 ||  || — || September 25, 2007 || Mount Lemmon || Mount Lemmon Survey || — || align=right data-sort-value="0.77" | 770 m || 
|-id=261 bgcolor=#d6d6d6
| 367261 ||  || — || October 4, 2007 || Mount Lemmon || Mount Lemmon Survey || HIL || align=right | 6.3 km || 
|-id=262 bgcolor=#fefefe
| 367262 ||  || — || October 4, 2007 || Kitt Peak || Spacewatch || — || align=right data-sort-value="0.68" | 680 m || 
|-id=263 bgcolor=#fefefe
| 367263 ||  || — || October 4, 2007 || Kitt Peak || Spacewatch || — || align=right data-sort-value="0.88" | 880 m || 
|-id=264 bgcolor=#fefefe
| 367264 ||  || — || October 4, 2007 || Kitt Peak || Spacewatch || — || align=right data-sort-value="0.85" | 850 m || 
|-id=265 bgcolor=#d6d6d6
| 367265 ||  || — || October 11, 2007 || Alter Satzberg || M. Pietschnig || LIX || align=right | 3.5 km || 
|-id=266 bgcolor=#fefefe
| 367266 ||  || — || October 8, 2007 || Mount Lemmon || Mount Lemmon Survey || FLO || align=right data-sort-value="0.62" | 620 m || 
|-id=267 bgcolor=#fefefe
| 367267 ||  || — || September 12, 2007 || Mount Lemmon || Mount Lemmon Survey || FLO || align=right data-sort-value="0.66" | 660 m || 
|-id=268 bgcolor=#fefefe
| 367268 ||  || — || October 6, 2007 || Kitt Peak || Spacewatch || — || align=right data-sort-value="0.84" | 840 m || 
|-id=269 bgcolor=#d6d6d6
| 367269 ||  || — || October 6, 2007 || Socorro || LINEAR || — || align=right | 3.3 km || 
|-id=270 bgcolor=#fefefe
| 367270 ||  || — || October 9, 2007 || Socorro || LINEAR || — || align=right | 1.1 km || 
|-id=271 bgcolor=#fefefe
| 367271 ||  || — || October 13, 2007 || Socorro || LINEAR || — || align=right data-sort-value="0.59" | 590 m || 
|-id=272 bgcolor=#fefefe
| 367272 ||  || — || October 8, 2007 || Anderson Mesa || LONEOS || — || align=right data-sort-value="0.70" | 700 m || 
|-id=273 bgcolor=#fefefe
| 367273 ||  || — || October 7, 2007 || Mount Lemmon || Mount Lemmon Survey || — || align=right data-sort-value="0.63" | 630 m || 
|-id=274 bgcolor=#fefefe
| 367274 ||  || — || October 8, 2007 || Kitt Peak || Spacewatch || FLO || align=right data-sort-value="0.70" | 700 m || 
|-id=275 bgcolor=#fefefe
| 367275 ||  || — || October 7, 2007 || Kitt Peak || Spacewatch || — || align=right data-sort-value="0.76" | 760 m || 
|-id=276 bgcolor=#fefefe
| 367276 ||  || — || April 13, 2002 || Palomar || NEAT || V || align=right data-sort-value="0.73" | 730 m || 
|-id=277 bgcolor=#fefefe
| 367277 ||  || — || October 10, 2007 || Kitt Peak || Spacewatch || — || align=right data-sort-value="0.74" | 740 m || 
|-id=278 bgcolor=#fefefe
| 367278 ||  || — || October 9, 2007 || Kitt Peak || Spacewatch || — || align=right | 1.4 km || 
|-id=279 bgcolor=#d6d6d6
| 367279 ||  || — || October 11, 2007 || Kitt Peak || Spacewatch || KOR || align=right | 1.6 km || 
|-id=280 bgcolor=#fefefe
| 367280 ||  || — || October 11, 2007 || Catalina || CSS || — || align=right data-sort-value="0.68" | 680 m || 
|-id=281 bgcolor=#fefefe
| 367281 ||  || — || October 4, 2007 || Kitt Peak || Spacewatch || FLO || align=right data-sort-value="0.64" | 640 m || 
|-id=282 bgcolor=#fefefe
| 367282 ||  || — || October 12, 2007 || Kitt Peak || Spacewatch || — || align=right data-sort-value="0.71" | 710 m || 
|-id=283 bgcolor=#fefefe
| 367283 ||  || — || October 11, 2007 || Kitt Peak || Spacewatch || FLO || align=right data-sort-value="0.85" | 850 m || 
|-id=284 bgcolor=#fefefe
| 367284 ||  || — || October 10, 2007 || Mount Lemmon || Mount Lemmon Survey || — || align=right data-sort-value="0.74" | 740 m || 
|-id=285 bgcolor=#fefefe
| 367285 ||  || — || October 12, 2007 || Anderson Mesa || LONEOS || — || align=right data-sort-value="0.88" | 880 m || 
|-id=286 bgcolor=#fefefe
| 367286 ||  || — || October 14, 2007 || Mount Lemmon || Mount Lemmon Survey || — || align=right data-sort-value="0.60" | 600 m || 
|-id=287 bgcolor=#d6d6d6
| 367287 ||  || — || October 13, 2007 || Catalina || CSS || — || align=right | 3.7 km || 
|-id=288 bgcolor=#fefefe
| 367288 ||  || — || October 12, 2007 || Kitt Peak || Spacewatch || — || align=right data-sort-value="0.80" | 800 m || 
|-id=289 bgcolor=#fefefe
| 367289 ||  || — || March 18, 2002 || Kitt Peak || Spacewatch || MAS || align=right data-sort-value="0.85" | 850 m || 
|-id=290 bgcolor=#fefefe
| 367290 ||  || — || October 31, 2007 || Mount Lemmon || Mount Lemmon Survey || — || align=right data-sort-value="0.67" | 670 m || 
|-id=291 bgcolor=#fefefe
| 367291 ||  || — || October 30, 2007 || Mount Lemmon || Mount Lemmon Survey || NYS || align=right data-sort-value="0.59" | 590 m || 
|-id=292 bgcolor=#fefefe
| 367292 ||  || — || November 4, 2007 || Dauban || Chante-Perdrix Obs. || — || align=right data-sort-value="0.69" | 690 m || 
|-id=293 bgcolor=#fefefe
| 367293 ||  || — || November 1, 2007 || Kitt Peak || Spacewatch || — || align=right data-sort-value="0.99" | 990 m || 
|-id=294 bgcolor=#fefefe
| 367294 ||  || — || November 1, 2007 || Kitt Peak || Spacewatch || — || align=right data-sort-value="0.70" | 700 m || 
|-id=295 bgcolor=#fefefe
| 367295 ||  || — || November 1, 2007 || Kitt Peak || Spacewatch || FLO || align=right data-sort-value="0.65" | 650 m || 
|-id=296 bgcolor=#fefefe
| 367296 ||  || — || November 4, 2007 || Kitt Peak || Spacewatch || FLO || align=right data-sort-value="0.60" | 600 m || 
|-id=297 bgcolor=#fefefe
| 367297 ||  || — || May 20, 2006 || Siding Spring || SSS || — || align=right data-sort-value="0.83" | 830 m || 
|-id=298 bgcolor=#fefefe
| 367298 ||  || — || November 2, 2007 || Mount Lemmon || Mount Lemmon Survey || — || align=right | 1.2 km || 
|-id=299 bgcolor=#fefefe
| 367299 ||  || — || November 4, 2007 || Mount Lemmon || Mount Lemmon Survey || FLO || align=right data-sort-value="0.69" | 690 m || 
|-id=300 bgcolor=#fefefe
| 367300 ||  || — || November 14, 2007 || Kitt Peak || Spacewatch || FLO || align=right data-sort-value="0.60" | 600 m || 
|}

367301–367400 

|-bgcolor=#fefefe
| 367301 ||  || — || November 12, 2007 || Mount Lemmon || Mount Lemmon Survey || FLO || align=right data-sort-value="0.55" | 550 m || 
|-id=302 bgcolor=#fefefe
| 367302 ||  || — || November 4, 2007 || Catalina || CSS || PHO || align=right | 1.5 km || 
|-id=303 bgcolor=#fefefe
| 367303 ||  || — || November 6, 2007 || Kitt Peak || Spacewatch || — || align=right | 1.1 km || 
|-id=304 bgcolor=#fefefe
| 367304 ||  || — || November 1, 2007 || Kitt Peak || Spacewatch || — || align=right data-sort-value="0.89" | 890 m || 
|-id=305 bgcolor=#fefefe
| 367305 ||  || — || November 2, 2007 || Kitt Peak || Spacewatch || — || align=right data-sort-value="0.82" | 820 m || 
|-id=306 bgcolor=#fefefe
| 367306 ||  || — || March 16, 2005 || Catalina || CSS || ERI || align=right | 1.8 km || 
|-id=307 bgcolor=#E9E9E9
| 367307 ||  || — || November 8, 2007 || Mount Lemmon || Mount Lemmon Survey || JUN || align=right | 1.5 km || 
|-id=308 bgcolor=#fefefe
| 367308 ||  || — || November 17, 2007 || Socorro || LINEAR || FLO || align=right data-sort-value="0.65" | 650 m || 
|-id=309 bgcolor=#fefefe
| 367309 ||  || — || November 17, 2007 || Kitt Peak || Spacewatch || NYS || align=right data-sort-value="0.77" | 770 m || 
|-id=310 bgcolor=#fefefe
| 367310 ||  || — || November 19, 2007 || Kitt Peak || Spacewatch || V || align=right data-sort-value="0.73" | 730 m || 
|-id=311 bgcolor=#fefefe
| 367311 ||  || — || February 9, 2005 || Mount Lemmon || Mount Lemmon Survey || — || align=right data-sort-value="0.76" | 760 m || 
|-id=312 bgcolor=#fefefe
| 367312 ||  || — || November 11, 2007 || Mount Lemmon || Mount Lemmon Survey || — || align=right | 1.1 km || 
|-id=313 bgcolor=#fefefe
| 367313 ||  || — || December 30, 2007 || Kitt Peak || Spacewatch || — || align=right data-sort-value="0.84" | 840 m || 
|-id=314 bgcolor=#fefefe
| 367314 ||  || — || December 28, 2007 || Kitt Peak || Spacewatch || NYS || align=right data-sort-value="0.79" | 790 m || 
|-id=315 bgcolor=#fefefe
| 367315 ||  || — || December 14, 2007 || Socorro || LINEAR || FLO || align=right data-sort-value="0.56" | 560 m || 
|-id=316 bgcolor=#fefefe
| 367316 ||  || — || December 30, 2007 || Catalina || CSS || FLO || align=right data-sort-value="0.72" | 720 m || 
|-id=317 bgcolor=#fefefe
| 367317 ||  || — || December 20, 2007 || Kitt Peak || Spacewatch || — || align=right data-sort-value="0.81" | 810 m || 
|-id=318 bgcolor=#E9E9E9
| 367318 ||  || — || November 11, 2007 || Mount Lemmon || Mount Lemmon Survey || — || align=right | 1.1 km || 
|-id=319 bgcolor=#fefefe
| 367319 ||  || — || January 10, 2008 || Mount Lemmon || Mount Lemmon Survey || V || align=right data-sort-value="0.69" | 690 m || 
|-id=320 bgcolor=#E9E9E9
| 367320 ||  || — || December 30, 2007 || Mount Lemmon || Mount Lemmon Survey || — || align=right | 1.3 km || 
|-id=321 bgcolor=#fefefe
| 367321 ||  || — || January 10, 2008 || Kitt Peak || Spacewatch || FLO || align=right data-sort-value="0.54" | 540 m || 
|-id=322 bgcolor=#fefefe
| 367322 ||  || — || September 25, 2006 || Kitt Peak || Spacewatch || NYS || align=right data-sort-value="0.85" | 850 m || 
|-id=323 bgcolor=#d6d6d6
| 367323 ||  || — || December 30, 2007 || Kitt Peak || Spacewatch || — || align=right | 2.1 km || 
|-id=324 bgcolor=#E9E9E9
| 367324 ||  || — || January 11, 2008 || Kitt Peak || Spacewatch || KAZ || align=right | 1.3 km || 
|-id=325 bgcolor=#fefefe
| 367325 ||  || — || January 12, 2008 || Kitt Peak || Spacewatch || — || align=right data-sort-value="0.90" | 900 m || 
|-id=326 bgcolor=#fefefe
| 367326 ||  || — || January 14, 2008 || Kitt Peak || Spacewatch || — || align=right | 1.1 km || 
|-id=327 bgcolor=#E9E9E9
| 367327 ||  || — || January 13, 2008 || Kitt Peak || Spacewatch || — || align=right | 1.2 km || 
|-id=328 bgcolor=#fefefe
| 367328 ||  || — || January 30, 2008 || Kitt Peak || Spacewatch || — || align=right data-sort-value="0.89" | 890 m || 
|-id=329 bgcolor=#E9E9E9
| 367329 ||  || — || January 30, 2008 || Kitt Peak || Spacewatch || — || align=right | 2.1 km || 
|-id=330 bgcolor=#E9E9E9
| 367330 ||  || — || February 3, 2008 || Kitt Peak || Spacewatch || — || align=right data-sort-value="0.87" | 870 m || 
|-id=331 bgcolor=#E9E9E9
| 367331 ||  || — || December 5, 2007 || Mount Lemmon || Mount Lemmon Survey || — || align=right | 1.5 km || 
|-id=332 bgcolor=#E9E9E9
| 367332 ||  || — || February 11, 2008 || Kitt Peak || Spacewatch || — || align=right | 2.1 km || 
|-id=333 bgcolor=#E9E9E9
| 367333 ||  || — || February 7, 2008 || Kitt Peak || Spacewatch || — || align=right | 1.0 km || 
|-id=334 bgcolor=#E9E9E9
| 367334 ||  || — || February 8, 2008 || Kitt Peak || Spacewatch || — || align=right | 1.1 km || 
|-id=335 bgcolor=#E9E9E9
| 367335 ||  || — || February 8, 2008 || Kitt Peak || Spacewatch || VIB || align=right | 2.0 km || 
|-id=336 bgcolor=#E9E9E9
| 367336 ||  || — || February 3, 2008 || Mount Lemmon || Mount Lemmon Survey || ADE || align=right | 1.9 km || 
|-id=337 bgcolor=#fefefe
| 367337 ||  || — || January 31, 2008 || Socorro || LINEAR || — || align=right | 1.3 km || 
|-id=338 bgcolor=#E9E9E9
| 367338 ||  || — || February 2, 2008 || Kitt Peak || Spacewatch || — || align=right data-sort-value="0.90" | 900 m || 
|-id=339 bgcolor=#E9E9E9
| 367339 ||  || — || February 8, 2008 || Kitt Peak || Spacewatch || — || align=right data-sort-value="0.89" | 890 m || 
|-id=340 bgcolor=#E9E9E9
| 367340 ||  || — || February 9, 2008 || Kitt Peak || Spacewatch || — || align=right | 1.5 km || 
|-id=341 bgcolor=#FA8072
| 367341 ||  || — || February 24, 2008 || Mount Lemmon || Mount Lemmon Survey || — || align=right | 1.1 km || 
|-id=342 bgcolor=#E9E9E9
| 367342 ||  || — || February 27, 2008 || Kitt Peak || Spacewatch || — || align=right | 1.7 km || 
|-id=343 bgcolor=#E9E9E9
| 367343 ||  || — || February 27, 2008 || Mount Lemmon || Mount Lemmon Survey || — || align=right | 1.3 km || 
|-id=344 bgcolor=#E9E9E9
| 367344 ||  || — || March 2, 2008 || La Sagra || OAM Obs. || — || align=right | 1.5 km || 
|-id=345 bgcolor=#E9E9E9
| 367345 ||  || — || March 2, 2008 || Kitt Peak || Spacewatch || — || align=right data-sort-value="0.95" | 950 m || 
|-id=346 bgcolor=#fefefe
| 367346 ||  || — || March 5, 2008 || Mount Lemmon || Mount Lemmon Survey || — || align=right data-sort-value="0.95" | 950 m || 
|-id=347 bgcolor=#fefefe
| 367347 ||  || — || January 11, 2008 || Kitt Peak || Spacewatch || — || align=right | 1.0 km || 
|-id=348 bgcolor=#E9E9E9
| 367348 ||  || — || April 3, 2000 || Kitt Peak || Spacewatch || — || align=right | 1.2 km || 
|-id=349 bgcolor=#E9E9E9
| 367349 ||  || — || March 8, 2008 || Mount Lemmon || Mount Lemmon Survey || — || align=right | 2.1 km || 
|-id=350 bgcolor=#E9E9E9
| 367350 ||  || — || March 7, 2008 || Kitt Peak || Spacewatch || — || align=right | 2.3 km || 
|-id=351 bgcolor=#E9E9E9
| 367351 ||  || — || March 11, 2008 || Kitt Peak || Spacewatch || — || align=right | 3.2 km || 
|-id=352 bgcolor=#E9E9E9
| 367352 ||  || — || March 11, 2008 || Kitt Peak || Spacewatch || — || align=right | 1.2 km || 
|-id=353 bgcolor=#E9E9E9
| 367353 ||  || — || March 10, 2008 || Kitt Peak || Spacewatch || — || align=right | 1.3 km || 
|-id=354 bgcolor=#E9E9E9
| 367354 ||  || — || March 1, 2008 || Kitt Peak || Spacewatch || POS || align=right | 3.1 km || 
|-id=355 bgcolor=#fefefe
| 367355 ||  || — || March 26, 2008 || Mount Lemmon || Mount Lemmon Survey || V || align=right data-sort-value="0.75" | 750 m || 
|-id=356 bgcolor=#E9E9E9
| 367356 ||  || — || February 26, 2008 || Mount Lemmon || Mount Lemmon Survey || — || align=right | 1.0 km || 
|-id=357 bgcolor=#E9E9E9
| 367357 ||  || — || March 26, 2008 || Kitt Peak || Spacewatch || — || align=right | 2.5 km || 
|-id=358 bgcolor=#E9E9E9
| 367358 ||  || — || March 27, 2008 || Kitt Peak || Spacewatch || — || align=right | 1.6 km || 
|-id=359 bgcolor=#E9E9E9
| 367359 ||  || — || March 8, 2008 || Kitt Peak || Spacewatch || — || align=right | 2.7 km || 
|-id=360 bgcolor=#E9E9E9
| 367360 ||  || — || March 30, 2008 || Kitt Peak || Spacewatch || — || align=right | 1.5 km || 
|-id=361 bgcolor=#E9E9E9
| 367361 ||  || — || March 30, 2008 || Catalina || CSS || ADE || align=right | 2.2 km || 
|-id=362 bgcolor=#E9E9E9
| 367362 ||  || — || March 29, 2008 || Kitt Peak || Spacewatch || — || align=right | 1.9 km || 
|-id=363 bgcolor=#E9E9E9
| 367363 ||  || — || March 30, 2008 || Kitt Peak || Spacewatch || — || align=right | 2.5 km || 
|-id=364 bgcolor=#E9E9E9
| 367364 ||  || — || March 31, 2008 || Mount Lemmon || Mount Lemmon Survey || — || align=right data-sort-value="0.95" | 950 m || 
|-id=365 bgcolor=#E9E9E9
| 367365 ||  || — || March 31, 2008 || Kitt Peak || Spacewatch || — || align=right | 1.5 km || 
|-id=366 bgcolor=#E9E9E9
| 367366 ||  || — || March 31, 2008 || Mount Lemmon || Mount Lemmon Survey || NEM || align=right | 1.9 km || 
|-id=367 bgcolor=#E9E9E9
| 367367 ||  || — || March 29, 2008 || Kitt Peak || Spacewatch || — || align=right | 1.9 km || 
|-id=368 bgcolor=#E9E9E9
| 367368 ||  || — || March 30, 2008 || Kitt Peak || Spacewatch || MRX || align=right | 1.2 km || 
|-id=369 bgcolor=#E9E9E9
| 367369 ||  || — || March 30, 2008 || Kitt Peak || Spacewatch || MRX || align=right | 1.3 km || 
|-id=370 bgcolor=#E9E9E9
| 367370 ||  || — || April 3, 2008 || Kitt Peak || Spacewatch || — || align=right | 1.7 km || 
|-id=371 bgcolor=#E9E9E9
| 367371 ||  || — || April 4, 2008 || Kitt Peak || Spacewatch || — || align=right | 2.5 km || 
|-id=372 bgcolor=#E9E9E9
| 367372 ||  || — || April 6, 2008 || Kitt Peak || Spacewatch || GAL || align=right | 1.9 km || 
|-id=373 bgcolor=#E9E9E9
| 367373 ||  || — || April 7, 2008 || Kitt Peak || Spacewatch || — || align=right | 1.6 km || 
|-id=374 bgcolor=#E9E9E9
| 367374 ||  || — || April 8, 2008 || Kitt Peak || Spacewatch || — || align=right | 1.6 km || 
|-id=375 bgcolor=#E9E9E9
| 367375 ||  || — || February 28, 2008 || Kitt Peak || Spacewatch || — || align=right | 1.4 km || 
|-id=376 bgcolor=#E9E9E9
| 367376 ||  || — || April 7, 2008 || Catalina || CSS || — || align=right | 2.1 km || 
|-id=377 bgcolor=#E9E9E9
| 367377 ||  || — || April 5, 2008 || Catalina || CSS || — || align=right | 2.9 km || 
|-id=378 bgcolor=#E9E9E9
| 367378 ||  || — || April 24, 2008 || Kitt Peak || Spacewatch || DOR || align=right | 3.1 km || 
|-id=379 bgcolor=#E9E9E9
| 367379 ||  || — || April 24, 2008 || Kitt Peak || Spacewatch || — || align=right | 2.5 km || 
|-id=380 bgcolor=#E9E9E9
| 367380 ||  || — || April 29, 2008 || Kitt Peak || Spacewatch || — || align=right | 2.8 km || 
|-id=381 bgcolor=#E9E9E9
| 367381 ||  || — || April 30, 2008 || Kitt Peak || Spacewatch || — || align=right | 2.1 km || 
|-id=382 bgcolor=#E9E9E9
| 367382 ||  || — || May 3, 2008 || Kitt Peak || Spacewatch || — || align=right | 2.7 km || 
|-id=383 bgcolor=#E9E9E9
| 367383 ||  || — || May 13, 2008 || Mount Lemmon || Mount Lemmon Survey || — || align=right | 2.7 km || 
|-id=384 bgcolor=#E9E9E9
| 367384 ||  || — || May 1, 2008 || Kitt Peak || Spacewatch || — || align=right | 2.4 km || 
|-id=385 bgcolor=#E9E9E9
| 367385 ||  || — || May 17, 1999 || Kitt Peak || Spacewatch || — || align=right | 2.6 km || 
|-id=386 bgcolor=#E9E9E9
| 367386 ||  || — || May 11, 2008 || Socorro || LINEAR || — || align=right | 3.4 km || 
|-id=387 bgcolor=#d6d6d6
| 367387 ||  || — || June 6, 2008 || Kitt Peak || Spacewatch || EOS || align=right | 2.1 km || 
|-id=388 bgcolor=#E9E9E9
| 367388 ||  || — || June 10, 2008 || Magdalena Ridge || W. H. Ryan || — || align=right | 2.7 km || 
|-id=389 bgcolor=#d6d6d6
| 367389 ||  || — || June 30, 2008 || Kitt Peak || Spacewatch || EOS || align=right | 2.0 km || 
|-id=390 bgcolor=#FFC2E0
| 367390 ||  || — || June 30, 2008 || Kitt Peak || Spacewatch || APO || align=right data-sort-value="0.51" | 510 m || 
|-id=391 bgcolor=#E9E9E9
| 367391 ||  || — || July 2, 2008 || La Sagra || OAM Obs. || POS || align=right | 3.1 km || 
|-id=392 bgcolor=#d6d6d6
| 367392 Zeri ||  ||  || July 31, 2008 || Vallemare di Borbona || V. S. Casulli || — || align=right | 4.6 km || 
|-id=393 bgcolor=#d6d6d6
| 367393 ||  || — || July 29, 2008 || Kitt Peak || Spacewatch || — || align=right | 4.9 km || 
|-id=394 bgcolor=#d6d6d6
| 367394 ||  || — || July 30, 2008 || Kitt Peak || Spacewatch || — || align=right | 2.5 km || 
|-id=395 bgcolor=#d6d6d6
| 367395 ||  || — || July 26, 2008 || Siding Spring || SSS || EOS || align=right | 2.2 km || 
|-id=396 bgcolor=#d6d6d6
| 367396 ||  || — || August 3, 2008 || La Sagra || OAM Obs. || — || align=right | 3.3 km || 
|-id=397 bgcolor=#d6d6d6
| 367397 ||  || — || August 5, 2008 || La Sagra || OAM Obs. || — || align=right | 3.7 km || 
|-id=398 bgcolor=#d6d6d6
| 367398 ||  || — || August 10, 2008 || La Sagra || OAM Obs. || — || align=right | 3.2 km || 
|-id=399 bgcolor=#E9E9E9
| 367399 ||  || — || August 10, 2008 || La Sagra || OAM Obs. || — || align=right | 2.8 km || 
|-id=400 bgcolor=#d6d6d6
| 367400 ||  || — || August 10, 2008 || La Sagra || OAM Obs. || — || align=right | 2.5 km || 
|}

367401–367500 

|-bgcolor=#d6d6d6
| 367401 ||  || — || August 6, 2008 || Tiki || N. Teamo || — || align=right | 3.7 km || 
|-id=402 bgcolor=#d6d6d6
| 367402 ||  || — || August 1, 2008 || Socorro || LINEAR || EOS || align=right | 2.9 km || 
|-id=403 bgcolor=#fefefe
| 367403 ||  || — || August 26, 2008 || Dauban || F. Kugel || H || align=right data-sort-value="0.87" | 870 m || 
|-id=404 bgcolor=#d6d6d6
| 367404 Andreasrebers ||  ||  || August 29, 2008 || Wildberg || R. Apitzsch || — || align=right | 2.4 km || 
|-id=405 bgcolor=#d6d6d6
| 367405 ||  || — || August 26, 2008 || Socorro || LINEAR || — || align=right | 3.1 km || 
|-id=406 bgcolor=#d6d6d6
| 367406 Buser ||  ||  || August 30, 2008 || Winterthur || M. Griesser || — || align=right | 3.1 km || 
|-id=407 bgcolor=#d6d6d6
| 367407 ||  || — || August 27, 2008 || La Sagra || OAM Obs. || — || align=right | 5.9 km || 
|-id=408 bgcolor=#d6d6d6
| 367408 ||  || — || August 30, 2008 || Socorro || LINEAR || — || align=right | 6.0 km || 
|-id=409 bgcolor=#d6d6d6
| 367409 ||  || — || August 21, 2008 || Kitt Peak || Spacewatch || — || align=right | 2.5 km || 
|-id=410 bgcolor=#d6d6d6
| 367410 ||  || — || August 21, 2008 || Kitt Peak || Spacewatch || — || align=right | 2.6 km || 
|-id=411 bgcolor=#d6d6d6
| 367411 ||  || — || September 2, 2008 || Kitt Peak || Spacewatch || ALA || align=right | 3.6 km || 
|-id=412 bgcolor=#d6d6d6
| 367412 ||  || — || September 5, 2008 || Socorro || LINEAR || EOS || align=right | 2.4 km || 
|-id=413 bgcolor=#d6d6d6
| 367413 ||  || — || September 2, 2008 || Kitt Peak || Spacewatch || — || align=right | 2.4 km || 
|-id=414 bgcolor=#d6d6d6
| 367414 ||  || — || September 3, 2008 || Kitt Peak || Spacewatch || — || align=right | 3.3 km || 
|-id=415 bgcolor=#d6d6d6
| 367415 ||  || — || September 4, 2008 || Kitt Peak || Spacewatch || VER || align=right | 3.4 km || 
|-id=416 bgcolor=#d6d6d6
| 367416 ||  || — || September 6, 2008 || Kitt Peak || Spacewatch || — || align=right | 4.2 km || 
|-id=417 bgcolor=#fefefe
| 367417 ||  || — || September 3, 2008 || Kitt Peak || Spacewatch || H || align=right data-sort-value="0.47" | 470 m || 
|-id=418 bgcolor=#d6d6d6
| 367418 ||  || — || September 4, 2008 || Kitt Peak || Spacewatch || — || align=right | 2.7 km || 
|-id=419 bgcolor=#d6d6d6
| 367419 ||  || — || September 4, 2008 || Kitt Peak || Spacewatch || — || align=right | 2.8 km || 
|-id=420 bgcolor=#d6d6d6
| 367420 ||  || — || September 7, 2008 || Catalina || CSS || — || align=right | 2.9 km || 
|-id=421 bgcolor=#fefefe
| 367421 ||  || — || September 9, 2008 || Catalina || CSS || H || align=right data-sort-value="0.62" | 620 m || 
|-id=422 bgcolor=#d6d6d6
| 367422 ||  || — || September 6, 2008 || Catalina || CSS || EOS || align=right | 2.2 km || 
|-id=423 bgcolor=#d6d6d6
| 367423 ||  || — || September 7, 2008 || Mount Lemmon || Mount Lemmon Survey || — || align=right | 3.1 km || 
|-id=424 bgcolor=#d6d6d6
| 367424 ||  || — || September 2, 2008 || Kitt Peak || Spacewatch || — || align=right | 4.6 km || 
|-id=425 bgcolor=#d6d6d6
| 367425 ||  || — || September 6, 2008 || Kitt Peak || Spacewatch || HYG || align=right | 3.1 km || 
|-id=426 bgcolor=#fefefe
| 367426 ||  || — || September 23, 2008 || Catalina || CSS || H || align=right data-sort-value="0.65" | 650 m || 
|-id=427 bgcolor=#d6d6d6
| 367427 ||  || — || September 22, 2008 || Socorro || LINEAR || EOS || align=right | 2.4 km || 
|-id=428 bgcolor=#E9E9E9
| 367428 ||  || — || September 22, 2008 || Calvin-Rehoboth || Calvin–Rehoboth Obs. || — || align=right | 2.4 km || 
|-id=429 bgcolor=#d6d6d6
| 367429 ||  || — || September 19, 2008 || Kitt Peak || Spacewatch || — || align=right | 2.4 km || 
|-id=430 bgcolor=#d6d6d6
| 367430 ||  || — || September 19, 2008 || Kitt Peak || Spacewatch || — || align=right | 2.4 km || 
|-id=431 bgcolor=#d6d6d6
| 367431 ||  || — || September 19, 2008 || Kitt Peak || Spacewatch || — || align=right | 3.6 km || 
|-id=432 bgcolor=#d6d6d6
| 367432 ||  || — || September 20, 2008 || Mount Lemmon || Mount Lemmon Survey || HYG || align=right | 2.5 km || 
|-id=433 bgcolor=#d6d6d6
| 367433 ||  || — || September 4, 2008 || Kitt Peak || Spacewatch || HYG || align=right | 2.9 km || 
|-id=434 bgcolor=#d6d6d6
| 367434 ||  || — || September 21, 2008 || Mount Lemmon || Mount Lemmon Survey || Tj (2.92) || align=right | 3.9 km || 
|-id=435 bgcolor=#d6d6d6
| 367435 ||  || — || September 3, 2008 || Kitt Peak || Spacewatch || HYG || align=right | 2.3 km || 
|-id=436 bgcolor=#d6d6d6
| 367436 Siena ||  ||  || September 27, 2008 || Taunus || S. Karge, E. Schwab || HYG || align=right | 2.7 km || 
|-id=437 bgcolor=#d6d6d6
| 367437 ||  || — || September 23, 2008 || Kitt Peak || Spacewatch || 7:4 || align=right | 3.8 km || 
|-id=438 bgcolor=#d6d6d6
| 367438 ||  || — || September 28, 2008 || Sierra Stars || F. Tozzi || — || align=right | 3.4 km || 
|-id=439 bgcolor=#d6d6d6
| 367439 ||  || — || September 24, 2008 || Mount Lemmon || Mount Lemmon Survey || — || align=right | 3.1 km || 
|-id=440 bgcolor=#d6d6d6
| 367440 ||  || — || August 22, 2008 || Kitt Peak || Spacewatch || — || align=right | 3.4 km || 
|-id=441 bgcolor=#d6d6d6
| 367441 ||  || — || September 29, 2008 || Kitt Peak || Spacewatch || EUP || align=right | 5.1 km || 
|-id=442 bgcolor=#d6d6d6
| 367442 ||  || — || September 20, 2008 || Kitt Peak || Spacewatch || THM || align=right | 2.8 km || 
|-id=443 bgcolor=#fefefe
| 367443 ||  || — || September 22, 2008 || Mount Lemmon || Mount Lemmon Survey || H || align=right data-sort-value="0.69" | 690 m || 
|-id=444 bgcolor=#fefefe
| 367444 ||  || — || September 23, 2008 || Kitt Peak || Spacewatch || H || align=right data-sort-value="0.81" | 810 m || 
|-id=445 bgcolor=#d6d6d6
| 367445 ||  || — || September 23, 2008 || Mount Lemmon || Mount Lemmon Survey || — || align=right | 3.0 km || 
|-id=446 bgcolor=#d6d6d6
| 367446 ||  || — || September 28, 2008 || Socorro || LINEAR || — || align=right | 3.1 km || 
|-id=447 bgcolor=#d6d6d6
| 367447 ||  || — || October 6, 2008 || Socorro || LINEAR || — || align=right | 5.5 km || 
|-id=448 bgcolor=#d6d6d6
| 367448 ||  || — || April 24, 2007 || Mount Lemmon || Mount Lemmon Survey || EUP || align=right | 2.2 km || 
|-id=449 bgcolor=#d6d6d6
| 367449 ||  || — || October 6, 2008 || Catalina || CSS || — || align=right | 3.1 km || 
|-id=450 bgcolor=#d6d6d6
| 367450 ||  || — || September 3, 2008 || Kitt Peak || Spacewatch || — || align=right | 2.6 km || 
|-id=451 bgcolor=#d6d6d6
| 367451 ||  || — || October 9, 2008 || Mount Lemmon || Mount Lemmon Survey || URS || align=right | 4.3 km || 
|-id=452 bgcolor=#d6d6d6
| 367452 ||  || — || October 21, 2008 || Kitt Peak || Spacewatch || 7:4 || align=right | 3.2 km || 
|-id=453 bgcolor=#d6d6d6
| 367453 ||  || — || October 22, 2008 || Kitt Peak || Spacewatch || — || align=right | 2.5 km || 
|-id=454 bgcolor=#d6d6d6
| 367454 ||  || — || October 22, 2008 || Kitt Peak || Spacewatch || — || align=right | 3.5 km || 
|-id=455 bgcolor=#d6d6d6
| 367455 ||  || — || October 24, 2008 || Catalina || CSS || THB || align=right | 3.6 km || 
|-id=456 bgcolor=#d6d6d6
| 367456 ||  || — || March 3, 2005 || Catalina || CSS || — || align=right | 4.1 km || 
|-id=457 bgcolor=#d6d6d6
| 367457 ||  || — || October 28, 2008 || Kitt Peak || Spacewatch || — || align=right | 2.9 km || 
|-id=458 bgcolor=#d6d6d6
| 367458 ||  || — || October 30, 2008 || Mount Lemmon || Mount Lemmon Survey || EUP || align=right | 3.3 km || 
|-id=459 bgcolor=#d6d6d6
| 367459 ||  || — || October 18, 2008 || Kitt Peak || Spacewatch || — || align=right | 3.4 km || 
|-id=460 bgcolor=#d6d6d6
| 367460 ||  || — || November 3, 2008 || Kitt Peak || Spacewatch || — || align=right | 3.7 km || 
|-id=461 bgcolor=#fefefe
| 367461 ||  || — || November 18, 2008 || Catalina || CSS || H || align=right data-sort-value="0.56" | 560 m || 
|-id=462 bgcolor=#d6d6d6
| 367462 ||  || — || November 18, 2008 || Socorro || LINEAR || TRP || align=right | 2.9 km || 
|-id=463 bgcolor=#fefefe
| 367463 ||  || — || January 29, 2009 || Kitt Peak || Spacewatch || — || align=right data-sort-value="0.67" | 670 m || 
|-id=464 bgcolor=#fefefe
| 367464 ||  || — || January 19, 2009 || Mount Lemmon || Mount Lemmon Survey || — || align=right data-sort-value="0.88" | 880 m || 
|-id=465 bgcolor=#fefefe
| 367465 ||  || — || January 31, 2009 || Mount Lemmon || Mount Lemmon Survey || — || align=right data-sort-value="0.93" | 930 m || 
|-id=466 bgcolor=#fefefe
| 367466 ||  || — || January 18, 2009 || Kitt Peak || Spacewatch || — || align=right data-sort-value="0.85" | 850 m || 
|-id=467 bgcolor=#fefefe
| 367467 ||  || — || February 1, 2009 || Kitt Peak || Spacewatch || FLO || align=right data-sort-value="0.54" | 540 m || 
|-id=468 bgcolor=#fefefe
| 367468 ||  || — || February 17, 2009 || Heppenheim || Starkenburg Obs. || — || align=right data-sort-value="0.65" | 650 m || 
|-id=469 bgcolor=#fefefe
| 367469 ||  || — || March 6, 2002 || Palomar || NEAT || FLO || align=right data-sort-value="0.67" | 670 m || 
|-id=470 bgcolor=#fefefe
| 367470 ||  || — || February 19, 2009 || Kitt Peak || Spacewatch || — || align=right data-sort-value="0.78" | 780 m || 
|-id=471 bgcolor=#fefefe
| 367471 ||  || — || February 19, 2009 || Kitt Peak || Spacewatch || — || align=right data-sort-value="0.68" | 680 m || 
|-id=472 bgcolor=#fefefe
| 367472 ||  || — || February 22, 2009 || Kitt Peak || Spacewatch || NYS || align=right data-sort-value="0.53" | 530 m || 
|-id=473 bgcolor=#fefefe
| 367473 ||  || — || February 22, 2009 || Kitt Peak || Spacewatch || — || align=right | 1.0 km || 
|-id=474 bgcolor=#fefefe
| 367474 ||  || — || February 27, 2009 || Catalina || CSS || — || align=right data-sort-value="0.67" | 670 m || 
|-id=475 bgcolor=#fefefe
| 367475 ||  || — || February 27, 2009 || Kitt Peak || Spacewatch || — || align=right data-sort-value="0.94" | 940 m || 
|-id=476 bgcolor=#fefefe
| 367476 ||  || — || February 24, 2009 || Mount Lemmon || Mount Lemmon Survey || FLO || align=right data-sort-value="0.64" | 640 m || 
|-id=477 bgcolor=#fefefe
| 367477 ||  || — || February 27, 2009 || Kitt Peak || Spacewatch || — || align=right data-sort-value="0.80" | 800 m || 
|-id=478 bgcolor=#fefefe
| 367478 ||  || — || March 1, 2009 || Kitt Peak || Spacewatch || NYS || align=right data-sort-value="0.69" | 690 m || 
|-id=479 bgcolor=#fefefe
| 367479 ||  || — || March 15, 2009 || Mount Lemmon || Mount Lemmon Survey || — || align=right data-sort-value="0.63" | 630 m || 
|-id=480 bgcolor=#fefefe
| 367480 ||  || — || March 16, 2009 || Kitt Peak || Spacewatch || — || align=right data-sort-value="0.77" | 770 m || 
|-id=481 bgcolor=#fefefe
| 367481 ||  || — || March 16, 2009 || Kitt Peak || Spacewatch || — || align=right data-sort-value="0.88" | 880 m || 
|-id=482 bgcolor=#fefefe
| 367482 ||  || — || March 21, 2009 || Catalina || CSS || — || align=right data-sort-value="0.78" | 780 m || 
|-id=483 bgcolor=#fefefe
| 367483 ||  || — || March 27, 2009 || Catalina || CSS || — || align=right data-sort-value="0.94" | 940 m || 
|-id=484 bgcolor=#fefefe
| 367484 ||  || — || March 27, 2009 || Catalina || CSS || — || align=right | 1.1 km || 
|-id=485 bgcolor=#fefefe
| 367485 ||  || — || March 28, 2009 || Kitt Peak || Spacewatch || MAS || align=right data-sort-value="0.84" | 840 m || 
|-id=486 bgcolor=#fefefe
| 367486 ||  || — || March 28, 2009 || Kitt Peak || Spacewatch || NYS || align=right data-sort-value="0.59" | 590 m || 
|-id=487 bgcolor=#fefefe
| 367487 ||  || — || April 3, 2009 || Cerro Burek || Alianza S4 Obs. || MAS || align=right data-sort-value="0.70" | 700 m || 
|-id=488 bgcolor=#fefefe
| 367488 Aloisortner ||  ||  || April 14, 2009 || Gaisberg || R. Gierlinger || — || align=right data-sort-value="0.76" | 760 m || 
|-id=489 bgcolor=#fefefe
| 367489 ||  || — || April 17, 2009 || Kitt Peak || Spacewatch || V || align=right data-sort-value="0.63" | 630 m || 
|-id=490 bgcolor=#fefefe
| 367490 ||  || — || April 17, 2009 || Mount Lemmon || Mount Lemmon Survey || MAS || align=right data-sort-value="0.66" | 660 m || 
|-id=491 bgcolor=#fefefe
| 367491 ||  || — || April 17, 2009 || Kitt Peak || Spacewatch || MAS || align=right data-sort-value="0.72" | 720 m || 
|-id=492 bgcolor=#fefefe
| 367492 ||  || — || April 19, 2009 || Kitt Peak || Spacewatch || FLO || align=right data-sort-value="0.68" | 680 m || 
|-id=493 bgcolor=#fefefe
| 367493 ||  || — || April 19, 2009 || Kitt Peak || Spacewatch || V || align=right data-sort-value="0.50" | 500 m || 
|-id=494 bgcolor=#fefefe
| 367494 ||  || — || April 20, 2009 || Kitt Peak || Spacewatch || — || align=right data-sort-value="0.81" | 810 m || 
|-id=495 bgcolor=#fefefe
| 367495 ||  || — || April 20, 2009 || Kitt Peak || Spacewatch || — || align=right data-sort-value="0.79" | 790 m || 
|-id=496 bgcolor=#fefefe
| 367496 ||  || — || March 16, 2009 || Kitt Peak || Spacewatch || MAS || align=right data-sort-value="0.75" | 750 m || 
|-id=497 bgcolor=#fefefe
| 367497 ||  || — || December 23, 2000 || Apache Point || SDSS || V || align=right data-sort-value="0.79" | 790 m || 
|-id=498 bgcolor=#fefefe
| 367498 ||  || — || March 31, 2009 || Kitt Peak || Spacewatch || — || align=right data-sort-value="0.79" | 790 m || 
|-id=499 bgcolor=#fefefe
| 367499 ||  || — || April 24, 2009 || Mount Lemmon || Mount Lemmon Survey || MAS || align=right data-sort-value="0.76" | 760 m || 
|-id=500 bgcolor=#fefefe
| 367500 ||  || — || April 28, 2009 || Catalina || CSS || — || align=right data-sort-value="0.86" | 860 m || 
|}

367501–367600 

|-bgcolor=#fefefe
| 367501 ||  || — || April 17, 2009 || Kitt Peak || Spacewatch || — || align=right data-sort-value="0.80" | 800 m || 
|-id=502 bgcolor=#fefefe
| 367502 ||  || — || April 22, 2009 || Kitt Peak || Spacewatch || — || align=right | 2.3 km || 
|-id=503 bgcolor=#fefefe
| 367503 ||  || — || May 14, 2009 || Mount Lemmon || Mount Lemmon Survey || NYS || align=right data-sort-value="0.67" | 670 m || 
|-id=504 bgcolor=#fefefe
| 367504 ||  || — || April 2, 2009 || Kitt Peak || Spacewatch || NYS || align=right data-sort-value="0.73" | 730 m || 
|-id=505 bgcolor=#fefefe
| 367505 ||  || — || May 18, 2009 || La Sagra || OAM Obs. || PHO || align=right data-sort-value="0.99" | 990 m || 
|-id=506 bgcolor=#fefefe
| 367506 ||  || — || May 26, 2009 || Kitt Peak || Spacewatch || MAS || align=right data-sort-value="0.65" | 650 m || 
|-id=507 bgcolor=#fefefe
| 367507 ||  || — || May 30, 2009 || Mount Lemmon || Mount Lemmon Survey || — || align=right data-sort-value="0.91" | 910 m || 
|-id=508 bgcolor=#fefefe
| 367508 ||  || — || May 16, 2009 || Kitt Peak || Spacewatch || — || align=right | 1.1 km || 
|-id=509 bgcolor=#fefefe
| 367509 ||  || — || June 15, 2009 || XuYi || PMO NEO || — || align=right | 1.6 km || 
|-id=510 bgcolor=#fefefe
| 367510 ||  || — || April 22, 2009 || Mount Lemmon || Mount Lemmon Survey || CIM || align=right | 2.8 km || 
|-id=511 bgcolor=#E9E9E9
| 367511 ||  || — || August 1, 2005 || Siding Spring || SSS || EUN || align=right | 2.0 km || 
|-id=512 bgcolor=#E9E9E9
| 367512 ||  || — || July 13, 2009 || Kitt Peak || Spacewatch || — || align=right | 1.3 km || 
|-id=513 bgcolor=#E9E9E9
| 367513 ||  || — || July 16, 2009 || La Sagra || OAM Obs. || — || align=right | 1.3 km || 
|-id=514 bgcolor=#E9E9E9
| 367514 ||  || — || July 24, 2009 || Črni Vrh || Črni Vrh || JUN || align=right | 1.3 km || 
|-id=515 bgcolor=#E9E9E9
| 367515 ||  || — || July 28, 2009 || La Sagra || OAM Obs. || — || align=right | 1.2 km || 
|-id=516 bgcolor=#E9E9E9
| 367516 ||  || — || July 25, 2009 || La Sagra || OAM Obs. || — || align=right | 1.1 km || 
|-id=517 bgcolor=#E9E9E9
| 367517 ||  || — || July 31, 2009 || Catalina || CSS || — || align=right | 2.0 km || 
|-id=518 bgcolor=#E9E9E9
| 367518 ||  || — || August 15, 2009 || Farra d'Isonzo || Farra d'Isonzo || — || align=right | 1.2 km || 
|-id=519 bgcolor=#E9E9E9
| 367519 ||  || — || August 15, 2009 || Skylive Obs. || F. Tozzi || — || align=right | 1.2 km || 
|-id=520 bgcolor=#E9E9E9
| 367520 ||  || — || August 15, 2009 || Kitt Peak || Spacewatch || RAF || align=right | 1.0 km || 
|-id=521 bgcolor=#E9E9E9
| 367521 ||  || — || August 15, 2009 || Kitt Peak || Spacewatch || — || align=right | 1.7 km || 
|-id=522 bgcolor=#E9E9E9
| 367522 ||  || — || August 15, 2009 || Kitt Peak || Spacewatch || WIT || align=right | 1.0 km || 
|-id=523 bgcolor=#E9E9E9
| 367523 ||  || — || August 16, 2009 || Catalina || CSS || — || align=right | 1.9 km || 
|-id=524 bgcolor=#E9E9E9
| 367524 ||  || — || August 18, 2009 || Pla D'Arguines || Pla D'Arguines Obs. || — || align=right | 3.1 km || 
|-id=525 bgcolor=#FFC2E0
| 367525 ||  || — || August 19, 2009 || Catalina || CSS || AMO +1km || align=right data-sort-value="0.96" | 960 m || 
|-id=526 bgcolor=#fefefe
| 367526 ||  || — || August 16, 2009 || Kitt Peak || Spacewatch || NYS || align=right data-sort-value="0.64" | 640 m || 
|-id=527 bgcolor=#E9E9E9
| 367527 ||  || — || August 16, 2009 || Kitt Peak || Spacewatch || — || align=right | 1.9 km || 
|-id=528 bgcolor=#E9E9E9
| 367528 ||  || — || August 18, 2009 || La Sagra || OAM Obs. || — || align=right data-sort-value="0.79" | 790 m || 
|-id=529 bgcolor=#E9E9E9
| 367529 ||  || — || June 24, 2009 || Mount Lemmon || Mount Lemmon Survey || — || align=right | 2.0 km || 
|-id=530 bgcolor=#d6d6d6
| 367530 ||  || — || August 24, 2009 || La Sagra || OAM Obs. || BRA || align=right | 1.8 km || 
|-id=531 bgcolor=#E9E9E9
| 367531 ||  || — || July 31, 2009 || Kitt Peak || Spacewatch || — || align=right | 1.9 km || 
|-id=532 bgcolor=#E9E9E9
| 367532 ||  || — || August 23, 2009 || Hibiscus || N. Teamo || critical || align=right data-sort-value="0.71" | 710 m || 
|-id=533 bgcolor=#E9E9E9
| 367533 ||  || — || August 28, 2009 || Kitt Peak || Spacewatch || — || align=right | 1.7 km || 
|-id=534 bgcolor=#E9E9E9
| 367534 ||  || — || September 10, 2009 || Moletai || K. Černis, J. Zdanavičius || — || align=right | 1.5 km || 
|-id=535 bgcolor=#E9E9E9
| 367535 ||  || — || September 12, 2009 || Kitt Peak || Spacewatch || — || align=right | 1.8 km || 
|-id=536 bgcolor=#E9E9E9
| 367536 ||  || — || September 12, 2009 || Kitt Peak || Spacewatch || WIT || align=right | 1.1 km || 
|-id=537 bgcolor=#E9E9E9
| 367537 ||  || — || September 12, 2009 || Kitt Peak || Spacewatch || — || align=right | 1.4 km || 
|-id=538 bgcolor=#E9E9E9
| 367538 ||  || — || September 12, 2009 || Kitt Peak || Spacewatch || — || align=right | 1.7 km || 
|-id=539 bgcolor=#E9E9E9
| 367539 ||  || — || September 15, 2009 || Kitt Peak || Spacewatch || — || align=right | 1.7 km || 
|-id=540 bgcolor=#E9E9E9
| 367540 ||  || — || September 14, 2009 || Kitt Peak || Spacewatch || — || align=right | 2.0 km || 
|-id=541 bgcolor=#E9E9E9
| 367541 ||  || — || September 14, 2009 || Kitt Peak || Spacewatch || — || align=right | 1.5 km || 
|-id=542 bgcolor=#E9E9E9
| 367542 ||  || — || September 14, 2009 || Kitt Peak || Spacewatch || — || align=right | 1.5 km || 
|-id=543 bgcolor=#fefefe
| 367543 ||  || — || September 14, 2009 || Catalina || CSS || — || align=right | 1.1 km || 
|-id=544 bgcolor=#d6d6d6
| 367544 ||  || — || September 14, 2009 || Kitt Peak || Spacewatch || KAR || align=right data-sort-value="0.93" | 930 m || 
|-id=545 bgcolor=#E9E9E9
| 367545 ||  || — || September 15, 2009 || Kitt Peak || Spacewatch || PAD || align=right | 1.8 km || 
|-id=546 bgcolor=#d6d6d6
| 367546 ||  || — || September 15, 2009 || Kitt Peak || Spacewatch || KAR || align=right | 1.2 km || 
|-id=547 bgcolor=#E9E9E9
| 367547 ||  || — || September 15, 2009 || Kitt Peak || Spacewatch || MIS || align=right | 2.0 km || 
|-id=548 bgcolor=#E9E9E9
| 367548 ||  || — || September 15, 2009 || Kitt Peak || Spacewatch || WIT || align=right | 1.3 km || 
|-id=549 bgcolor=#E9E9E9
| 367549 ||  || — || September 8, 2009 || Siding Spring || SSS || BAR || align=right | 1.7 km || 
|-id=550 bgcolor=#d6d6d6
| 367550 ||  || — || February 26, 2007 || Mount Lemmon || Mount Lemmon Survey || — || align=right | 3.6 km || 
|-id=551 bgcolor=#E9E9E9
| 367551 ||  || — || September 23, 2000 || Socorro || LINEAR || — || align=right | 2.7 km || 
|-id=552 bgcolor=#E9E9E9
| 367552 ||  || — || September 16, 2009 || Kitt Peak || Spacewatch || — || align=right | 2.3 km || 
|-id=553 bgcolor=#E9E9E9
| 367553 ||  || — || September 16, 2009 || Kitt Peak || Spacewatch || — || align=right | 2.2 km || 
|-id=554 bgcolor=#E9E9E9
| 367554 ||  || — || September 16, 2009 || Kitt Peak || Spacewatch || — || align=right data-sort-value="0.90" | 900 m || 
|-id=555 bgcolor=#E9E9E9
| 367555 ||  || — || September 16, 2009 || Kitt Peak || Spacewatch || AGN || align=right | 1.2 km || 
|-id=556 bgcolor=#E9E9E9
| 367556 ||  || — || September 16, 2009 || Kitt Peak || Spacewatch || HOF || align=right | 2.3 km || 
|-id=557 bgcolor=#d6d6d6
| 367557 ||  || — || September 16, 2009 || Kitt Peak || Spacewatch || CHA || align=right | 2.2 km || 
|-id=558 bgcolor=#E9E9E9
| 367558 ||  || — || September 17, 2009 || Kitt Peak || Spacewatch || — || align=right | 1.9 km || 
|-id=559 bgcolor=#E9E9E9
| 367559 ||  || — || September 17, 2009 || Kitt Peak || Spacewatch || HOF || align=right | 2.4 km || 
|-id=560 bgcolor=#d6d6d6
| 367560 ||  || — || September 17, 2009 || Kitt Peak || Spacewatch || — || align=right | 3.0 km || 
|-id=561 bgcolor=#d6d6d6
| 367561 ||  || — || August 16, 2009 || Calvin-Rehoboth || L. A. Molnar || — || align=right | 2.5 km || 
|-id=562 bgcolor=#d6d6d6
| 367562 ||  || — || September 17, 2009 || Kitt Peak || Spacewatch || — || align=right | 3.9 km || 
|-id=563 bgcolor=#E9E9E9
| 367563 ||  || — || September 18, 2009 || Kitt Peak || Spacewatch || NEM || align=right | 2.5 km || 
|-id=564 bgcolor=#E9E9E9
| 367564 ||  || — || September 18, 2009 || Kitt Peak || Spacewatch || — || align=right | 1.5 km || 
|-id=565 bgcolor=#d6d6d6
| 367565 ||  || — || September 23, 2009 || Dauban || F. Kugel || — || align=right | 2.6 km || 
|-id=566 bgcolor=#E9E9E9
| 367566 ||  || — || September 16, 2009 || Kitt Peak || Spacewatch || — || align=right | 1.4 km || 
|-id=567 bgcolor=#E9E9E9
| 367567 ||  || — || September 16, 2009 || Mount Lemmon || Mount Lemmon Survey || WIT || align=right data-sort-value="0.92" | 920 m || 
|-id=568 bgcolor=#d6d6d6
| 367568 ||  || — || September 16, 2009 || Mount Lemmon || Mount Lemmon Survey || — || align=right | 3.9 km || 
|-id=569 bgcolor=#E9E9E9
| 367569 ||  || — || September 18, 2009 || Kitt Peak || Spacewatch || — || align=right | 1.2 km || 
|-id=570 bgcolor=#E9E9E9
| 367570 ||  || — || September 19, 2009 || Kitt Peak || Spacewatch || — || align=right | 1.8 km || 
|-id=571 bgcolor=#fefefe
| 367571 ||  || — || September 20, 2009 || Kitt Peak || Spacewatch || — || align=right data-sort-value="0.94" | 940 m || 
|-id=572 bgcolor=#E9E9E9
| 367572 ||  || — || February 21, 2007 || Mount Lemmon || Mount Lemmon Survey || — || align=right | 2.4 km || 
|-id=573 bgcolor=#E9E9E9
| 367573 ||  || — || November 2, 2000 || Kitt Peak || Spacewatch || PAD || align=right | 2.2 km || 
|-id=574 bgcolor=#E9E9E9
| 367574 ||  || — || September 18, 2009 || Mount Lemmon || Mount Lemmon Survey || MRX || align=right data-sort-value="0.78" | 780 m || 
|-id=575 bgcolor=#E9E9E9
| 367575 ||  || — || September 21, 2009 || Mount Lemmon || Mount Lemmon Survey || — || align=right | 1.1 km || 
|-id=576 bgcolor=#d6d6d6
| 367576 ||  || — || September 21, 2009 || Kitt Peak || Spacewatch || LAU || align=right | 1.3 km || 
|-id=577 bgcolor=#d6d6d6
| 367577 ||  || — || September 23, 2009 || Kitt Peak || Spacewatch || — || align=right | 3.2 km || 
|-id=578 bgcolor=#E9E9E9
| 367578 ||  || — || September 23, 2009 || Kitt Peak || Spacewatch || — || align=right | 2.0 km || 
|-id=579 bgcolor=#E9E9E9
| 367579 ||  || — || September 24, 2009 || Kitt Peak || Spacewatch || HOF || align=right | 2.6 km || 
|-id=580 bgcolor=#E9E9E9
| 367580 ||  || — || September 24, 2009 || Catalina || CSS || EUN || align=right | 1.6 km || 
|-id=581 bgcolor=#d6d6d6
| 367581 ||  || — || March 11, 2007 || Kitt Peak || Spacewatch || — || align=right | 3.9 km || 
|-id=582 bgcolor=#fefefe
| 367582 ||  || — || September 17, 2009 || Mount Lemmon || Mount Lemmon Survey || — || align=right | 1.2 km || 
|-id=583 bgcolor=#E9E9E9
| 367583 ||  || — || June 14, 2004 || Kitt Peak || Spacewatch || INO || align=right | 1.3 km || 
|-id=584 bgcolor=#E9E9E9
| 367584 ||  || — || August 19, 2009 || Catalina || CSS || — || align=right | 3.0 km || 
|-id=585 bgcolor=#E9E9E9
| 367585 ||  || — || September 20, 2009 || Kitt Peak || Spacewatch || MRX || align=right | 1.0 km || 
|-id=586 bgcolor=#E9E9E9
| 367586 ||  || — || September 20, 2009 || Kitt Peak || Spacewatch || DOR || align=right | 2.6 km || 
|-id=587 bgcolor=#d6d6d6
| 367587 ||  || — || September 24, 2009 || Kitt Peak || Spacewatch || — || align=right | 4.1 km || 
|-id=588 bgcolor=#d6d6d6
| 367588 ||  || — || September 23, 2009 || Kitt Peak || Spacewatch || — || align=right | 4.1 km || 
|-id=589 bgcolor=#E9E9E9
| 367589 ||  || — || September 23, 2009 || Mount Lemmon || Mount Lemmon Survey || — || align=right | 2.1 km || 
|-id=590 bgcolor=#E9E9E9
| 367590 ||  || — || September 23, 2009 || Mount Lemmon || Mount Lemmon Survey || — || align=right | 2.3 km || 
|-id=591 bgcolor=#d6d6d6
| 367591 ||  || — || December 7, 2004 || Socorro || LINEAR || TIR || align=right | 3.2 km || 
|-id=592 bgcolor=#E9E9E9
| 367592 ||  || — || September 17, 2009 || Kitt Peak || Spacewatch || — || align=right | 2.0 km || 
|-id=593 bgcolor=#E9E9E9
| 367593 ||  || — || September 25, 2009 || Kitt Peak || Spacewatch || — || align=right | 1.4 km || 
|-id=594 bgcolor=#d6d6d6
| 367594 ||  || — || September 21, 2009 || Kitt Peak || Spacewatch || CHA || align=right | 2.0 km || 
|-id=595 bgcolor=#E9E9E9
| 367595 ||  || — || September 18, 2009 || Mount Lemmon || Mount Lemmon Survey || WIT || align=right | 1.1 km || 
|-id=596 bgcolor=#d6d6d6
| 367596 ||  || — || September 19, 2009 || Mount Lemmon || Mount Lemmon Survey || — || align=right | 3.6 km || 
|-id=597 bgcolor=#E9E9E9
| 367597 ||  || — || September 28, 2009 || Catalina || CSS || — || align=right | 1.8 km || 
|-id=598 bgcolor=#d6d6d6
| 367598 ||  || — || March 13, 2007 || Mount Lemmon || Mount Lemmon Survey || — || align=right | 3.1 km || 
|-id=599 bgcolor=#d6d6d6
| 367599 ||  || — || September 18, 2009 || Kitt Peak || Spacewatch || KOR || align=right | 1.5 km || 
|-id=600 bgcolor=#E9E9E9
| 367600 ||  || — || September 25, 2009 || Kitt Peak || Spacewatch || MIS || align=right | 2.3 km || 
|}

367601–367700 

|-bgcolor=#d6d6d6
| 367601 ||  || — || February 7, 2006 || Catalina || CSS || — || align=right | 3.2 km || 
|-id=602 bgcolor=#d6d6d6
| 367602 ||  || — || September 19, 2009 || Antares || ARO || EOS || align=right | 2.6 km || 
|-id=603 bgcolor=#d6d6d6
| 367603 ||  || — || September 18, 2009 || Kitt Peak || Spacewatch || — || align=right | 2.0 km || 
|-id=604 bgcolor=#d6d6d6
| 367604 ||  || — || September 28, 2009 || Mount Lemmon || Mount Lemmon Survey || — || align=right | 3.4 km || 
|-id=605 bgcolor=#d6d6d6
| 367605 ||  || — || October 14, 2009 || Tzec Maun || F. Tozzi || — || align=right | 2.3 km || 
|-id=606 bgcolor=#E9E9E9
| 367606 ||  || — || October 14, 2009 || Jarnac || Jarnac Obs. || — || align=right | 3.4 km || 
|-id=607 bgcolor=#E9E9E9
| 367607 ||  || — || September 23, 2009 || Mount Lemmon || Mount Lemmon Survey || — || align=right | 2.4 km || 
|-id=608 bgcolor=#E9E9E9
| 367608 ||  || — || October 15, 2009 || Mount Lemmon || Mount Lemmon Survey || HOF || align=right | 2.5 km || 
|-id=609 bgcolor=#E9E9E9
| 367609 ||  || — || October 15, 2009 || Mount Lemmon || Mount Lemmon Survey || DOR || align=right | 3.4 km || 
|-id=610 bgcolor=#E9E9E9
| 367610 ||  || — || October 12, 2009 || Mount Lemmon || Mount Lemmon Survey || — || align=right | 2.5 km || 
|-id=611 bgcolor=#d6d6d6
| 367611 ||  || — || November 14, 1999 || Socorro || LINEAR || EOS || align=right | 2.3 km || 
|-id=612 bgcolor=#d6d6d6
| 367612 ||  || — || October 15, 2009 || Catalina || CSS || — || align=right | 5.2 km || 
|-id=613 bgcolor=#E9E9E9
| 367613 ||  || — || October 1, 2009 || Kitt Peak || Spacewatch || HOF || align=right | 2.2 km || 
|-id=614 bgcolor=#d6d6d6
| 367614 ||  || — || October 14, 2009 || Catalina || CSS || — || align=right | 3.2 km || 
|-id=615 bgcolor=#E9E9E9
| 367615 ||  || — || October 14, 2009 || Catalina || CSS || — || align=right | 2.1 km || 
|-id=616 bgcolor=#E9E9E9
| 367616 ||  || — || October 16, 2009 || Socorro || LINEAR || — || align=right | 2.5 km || 
|-id=617 bgcolor=#E9E9E9
| 367617 ||  || — || October 18, 2009 || Catalina || CSS || — || align=right | 3.1 km || 
|-id=618 bgcolor=#d6d6d6
| 367618 ||  || — || October 18, 2009 || Mount Lemmon || Mount Lemmon Survey || — || align=right | 2.0 km || 
|-id=619 bgcolor=#E9E9E9
| 367619 ||  || — || March 15, 2007 || Mount Lemmon || Mount Lemmon Survey || — || align=right | 2.9 km || 
|-id=620 bgcolor=#d6d6d6
| 367620 ||  || — || October 23, 2009 || Kitt Peak || Spacewatch || KOR || align=right | 1.5 km || 
|-id=621 bgcolor=#d6d6d6
| 367621 ||  || — || October 25, 2009 || Mount Lemmon || Mount Lemmon Survey || EMA || align=right | 3.6 km || 
|-id=622 bgcolor=#d6d6d6
| 367622 ||  || — || October 23, 2009 || Mount Lemmon || Mount Lemmon Survey || — || align=right | 3.2 km || 
|-id=623 bgcolor=#d6d6d6
| 367623 ||  || — || October 26, 2009 || Mount Lemmon || Mount Lemmon Survey || — || align=right | 5.1 km || 
|-id=624 bgcolor=#E9E9E9
| 367624 ||  || — || October 20, 2009 || Catalina || CSS || JUN || align=right | 1.2 km || 
|-id=625 bgcolor=#d6d6d6
| 367625 ||  || — || October 29, 2009 || Bisei SG Center || BATTeRS || — || align=right | 3.0 km || 
|-id=626 bgcolor=#d6d6d6
| 367626 ||  || — || October 26, 2009 || Mount Lemmon || Mount Lemmon Survey || — || align=right | 4.1 km || 
|-id=627 bgcolor=#d6d6d6
| 367627 ||  || — || November 8, 2009 || Kitt Peak || Spacewatch || — || align=right | 5.2 km || 
|-id=628 bgcolor=#d6d6d6
| 367628 ||  || — || November 8, 2009 || Kitt Peak || Spacewatch || — || align=right | 4.4 km || 
|-id=629 bgcolor=#d6d6d6
| 367629 ||  || — || January 23, 2006 || Kitt Peak || Spacewatch || — || align=right | 2.8 km || 
|-id=630 bgcolor=#d6d6d6
| 367630 ||  || — || November 11, 2009 || La Sagra || OAM Obs. || — || align=right | 3.4 km || 
|-id=631 bgcolor=#d6d6d6
| 367631 ||  || — || November 8, 2009 || Kitt Peak || Spacewatch || — || align=right | 3.3 km || 
|-id=632 bgcolor=#d6d6d6
| 367632 ||  || — || November 9, 2009 || Kitt Peak || Spacewatch || — || align=right | 3.5 km || 
|-id=633 bgcolor=#E9E9E9
| 367633 Shargorodskij ||  ||  || November 11, 2009 || Zelenchukskaya || T. V. Kryachko || — || align=right | 2.9 km || 
|-id=634 bgcolor=#d6d6d6
| 367634 ||  || — || November 10, 2009 || Kitt Peak || Spacewatch || EOS || align=right | 2.4 km || 
|-id=635 bgcolor=#d6d6d6
| 367635 ||  || — || November 9, 2009 || Kitt Peak || Spacewatch || — || align=right | 3.7 km || 
|-id=636 bgcolor=#d6d6d6
| 367636 ||  || — || November 9, 2009 || Catalina || CSS || — || align=right | 4.4 km || 
|-id=637 bgcolor=#d6d6d6
| 367637 ||  || — || November 10, 2009 || Kitt Peak || Spacewatch || EOS || align=right | 2.7 km || 
|-id=638 bgcolor=#FFC2E0
| 367638 ||  || — || November 18, 2009 || Catalina || CSS || AMOcritical || align=right data-sort-value="0.74" | 740 m || 
|-id=639 bgcolor=#d6d6d6
| 367639 ||  || — || November 19, 2009 || Kachina || J. Hobart || — || align=right | 5.8 km || 
|-id=640 bgcolor=#d6d6d6
| 367640 ||  || — || November 16, 2009 || Kitt Peak || Spacewatch || 628 || align=right | 2.0 km || 
|-id=641 bgcolor=#d6d6d6
| 367641 ||  || — || November 16, 2009 || Kitt Peak || Spacewatch || — || align=right | 3.4 km || 
|-id=642 bgcolor=#d6d6d6
| 367642 ||  || — || October 18, 2009 || Catalina || CSS || — || align=right | 3.0 km || 
|-id=643 bgcolor=#d6d6d6
| 367643 ||  || — || November 22, 2009 || Bisei SG Center || BATTeRS || — || align=right | 4.6 km || 
|-id=644 bgcolor=#d6d6d6
| 367644 ||  || — || November 16, 2009 || Socorro || LINEAR || — || align=right | 2.2 km || 
|-id=645 bgcolor=#d6d6d6
| 367645 ||  || — || September 26, 2003 || Apache Point || SDSS || EOS || align=right | 2.5 km || 
|-id=646 bgcolor=#d6d6d6
| 367646 ||  || — || October 30, 2009 || Mount Lemmon || Mount Lemmon Survey || — || align=right | 4.3 km || 
|-id=647 bgcolor=#d6d6d6
| 367647 ||  || — || November 18, 2009 || Kitt Peak || Spacewatch || EOS || align=right | 2.7 km || 
|-id=648 bgcolor=#d6d6d6
| 367648 ||  || — || November 18, 2009 || Kitt Peak || Spacewatch || EOS || align=right | 4.7 km || 
|-id=649 bgcolor=#d6d6d6
| 367649 ||  || — || November 18, 2009 || Kitt Peak || Spacewatch || EUP || align=right | 4.9 km || 
|-id=650 bgcolor=#d6d6d6
| 367650 ||  || — || December 13, 2004 || Campo Imperatore || CINEOS || EOS || align=right | 2.6 km || 
|-id=651 bgcolor=#d6d6d6
| 367651 ||  || — || November 19, 2009 || La Sagra || OAM Obs. || — || align=right | 3.3 km || 
|-id=652 bgcolor=#d6d6d6
| 367652 ||  || — || November 20, 2009 || Kitt Peak || Spacewatch || — || align=right | 3.8 km || 
|-id=653 bgcolor=#d6d6d6
| 367653 ||  || — || November 19, 2009 || Mount Lemmon || Mount Lemmon Survey || KOR || align=right | 1.5 km || 
|-id=654 bgcolor=#d6d6d6
| 367654 ||  || — || November 21, 2009 || Kitt Peak || Spacewatch || — || align=right | 3.9 km || 
|-id=655 bgcolor=#d6d6d6
| 367655 ||  || — || November 26, 2009 || Catalina || CSS || — || align=right | 4.1 km || 
|-id=656 bgcolor=#d6d6d6
| 367656 ||  || — || November 16, 2009 || Kitt Peak || Spacewatch || — || align=right | 2.8 km || 
|-id=657 bgcolor=#d6d6d6
| 367657 ||  || — || November 20, 2009 || Kitt Peak || Spacewatch || KOR || align=right | 1.4 km || 
|-id=658 bgcolor=#E9E9E9
| 367658 ||  || — || November 23, 2009 || Mount Lemmon || Mount Lemmon Survey || — || align=right | 2.0 km || 
|-id=659 bgcolor=#d6d6d6
| 367659 ||  || — || November 11, 2009 || Kitt Peak || Spacewatch || — || align=right | 2.9 km || 
|-id=660 bgcolor=#E9E9E9
| 367660 ||  || — || November 19, 2009 || Kitt Peak || Spacewatch || — || align=right | 1.0 km || 
|-id=661 bgcolor=#d6d6d6
| 367661 ||  || — || November 22, 2009 || Mount Lemmon || Mount Lemmon Survey || — || align=right | 4.5 km || 
|-id=662 bgcolor=#d6d6d6
| 367662 ||  || — || December 9, 2009 || La Sagra || OAM Obs. || — || align=right | 3.1 km || 
|-id=663 bgcolor=#d6d6d6
| 367663 ||  || — || December 15, 2009 || Bergisch Gladbach || W. Bickel || EUP || align=right | 6.5 km || 
|-id=664 bgcolor=#d6d6d6
| 367664 ||  || — || December 9, 2009 || Socorro || LINEAR || — || align=right | 4.8 km || 
|-id=665 bgcolor=#d6d6d6
| 367665 ||  || — || August 11, 2002 || Palomar || NEAT || URS || align=right | 7.9 km || 
|-id=666 bgcolor=#d6d6d6
| 367666 ||  || — || December 18, 2009 || Kitt Peak || Spacewatch || — || align=right | 3.8 km || 
|-id=667 bgcolor=#E9E9E9
| 367667 ||  || — || September 30, 2003 || Kitt Peak || Spacewatch || GEF || align=right | 1.8 km || 
|-id=668 bgcolor=#d6d6d6
| 367668 ||  || — || November 17, 2009 || Kitt Peak || Spacewatch || — || align=right | 5.3 km || 
|-id=669 bgcolor=#d6d6d6
| 367669 ||  || — || September 6, 2008 || Catalina || CSS || — || align=right | 3.4 km || 
|-id=670 bgcolor=#d6d6d6
| 367670 ||  || — || September 17, 2009 || Mount Lemmon || Mount Lemmon Survey || — || align=right | 5.2 km || 
|-id=671 bgcolor=#d6d6d6
| 367671 ||  || — || January 22, 2010 || WISE || WISE || — || align=right | 5.4 km || 
|-id=672 bgcolor=#d6d6d6
| 367672 ||  || — || August 23, 2007 || Kitt Peak || Spacewatch || EOS || align=right | 2.3 km || 
|-id=673 bgcolor=#d6d6d6
| 367673 ||  || — || February 13, 2010 || Catalina || CSS || — || align=right | 4.8 km || 
|-id=674 bgcolor=#d6d6d6
| 367674 ||  || — || March 6, 2010 || WISE || WISE || ALA || align=right | 6.1 km || 
|-id=675 bgcolor=#fefefe
| 367675 ||  || — || March 12, 2010 || Kitt Peak || Spacewatch || H || align=right data-sort-value="0.70" | 700 m || 
|-id=676 bgcolor=#FA8072
| 367676 ||  || — || May 12, 2010 || WISE || WISE || — || align=right data-sort-value="0.87" | 870 m || 
|-id=677 bgcolor=#fefefe
| 367677 ||  || — || June 17, 2010 || WISE || WISE || FLO || align=right | 1.1 km || 
|-id=678 bgcolor=#fefefe
| 367678 ||  || — || June 24, 2010 || WISE || WISE || — || align=right | 1.6 km || 
|-id=679 bgcolor=#fefefe
| 367679 ||  || — || June 30, 2010 || WISE || WISE || — || align=right | 1.7 km || 
|-id=680 bgcolor=#fefefe
| 367680 ||  || — || November 9, 2007 || Kitt Peak || Spacewatch || — || align=right data-sort-value="1" | 1000 m || 
|-id=681 bgcolor=#fefefe
| 367681 ||  || — || July 1, 2010 || WISE || WISE || FLO || align=right | 1.3 km || 
|-id=682 bgcolor=#fefefe
| 367682 ||  || — || July 12, 2010 || WISE || WISE || CLA || align=right | 1.8 km || 
|-id=683 bgcolor=#fefefe
| 367683 ||  || — || July 16, 2010 || WISE || WISE || CLA || align=right | 1.5 km || 
|-id=684 bgcolor=#FFC2E0
| 367684 ||  || — || July 20, 2010 || Socorro || LINEAR || APO +1km || align=right data-sort-value="0.5" | 500 m || 
|-id=685 bgcolor=#E9E9E9
| 367685 ||  || — || February 13, 2008 || Kitt Peak || Spacewatch || — || align=right | 2.6 km || 
|-id=686 bgcolor=#fefefe
| 367686 ||  || — || October 9, 2007 || Kitt Peak || Spacewatch || — || align=right data-sort-value="0.60" | 600 m || 
|-id=687 bgcolor=#fefefe
| 367687 ||  || — || September 28, 2003 || Socorro || LINEAR || — || align=right data-sort-value="0.84" | 840 m || 
|-id=688 bgcolor=#fefefe
| 367688 ||  || — || March 19, 1996 || Kitt Peak || Spacewatch || — || align=right data-sort-value="0.77" | 770 m || 
|-id=689 bgcolor=#fefefe
| 367689 ||  || — || March 5, 2006 || Kitt Peak || Spacewatch || — || align=right data-sort-value="0.62" | 620 m || 
|-id=690 bgcolor=#fefefe
| 367690 ||  || — || September 6, 2010 || Kitt Peak || Spacewatch || — || align=right data-sort-value="0.65" | 650 m || 
|-id=691 bgcolor=#fefefe
| 367691 ||  || — || September 8, 2010 || Socorro || LINEAR || — || align=right data-sort-value="0.89" | 890 m || 
|-id=692 bgcolor=#fefefe
| 367692 ||  || — || September 10, 2010 || Kitt Peak || Spacewatch || — || align=right data-sort-value="0.86" | 860 m || 
|-id=693 bgcolor=#fefefe
| 367693 Montmagastrell ||  ||  || September 13, 2010 || Montmagastrell || Montmagastrell Obs. || V || align=right data-sort-value="0.65" | 650 m || 
|-id=694 bgcolor=#fefefe
| 367694 ||  || — || September 14, 2010 || Kitt Peak || Spacewatch || — || align=right data-sort-value="0.70" | 700 m || 
|-id=695 bgcolor=#fefefe
| 367695 ||  || — || November 18, 2007 || Mount Lemmon || Mount Lemmon Survey || — || align=right data-sort-value="0.76" | 760 m || 
|-id=696 bgcolor=#fefefe
| 367696 ||  || — || September 12, 2010 || Kitt Peak || Spacewatch || — || align=right data-sort-value="0.60" | 600 m || 
|-id=697 bgcolor=#fefefe
| 367697 ||  || — || November 15, 2007 || Mount Lemmon || Mount Lemmon Survey || — || align=right data-sort-value="0.88" | 880 m || 
|-id=698 bgcolor=#fefefe
| 367698 ||  || — || September 10, 2010 || Mount Lemmon || Mount Lemmon Survey || — || align=right data-sort-value="0.99" | 990 m || 
|-id=699 bgcolor=#fefefe
| 367699 ||  || — || December 13, 2007 || Socorro || LINEAR || — || align=right data-sort-value="0.91" | 910 m || 
|-id=700 bgcolor=#fefefe
| 367700 ||  || — || December 8, 1996 || Kitt Peak || Spacewatch || NYS || align=right data-sort-value="0.62" | 620 m || 
|}

367701–367800 

|-bgcolor=#fefefe
| 367701 ||  || — || October 24, 2003 || Socorro || LINEAR || — || align=right data-sort-value="0.87" | 870 m || 
|-id=702 bgcolor=#fefefe
| 367702 ||  || — || November 19, 2003 || Palomar || NEAT || V || align=right data-sort-value="0.81" | 810 m || 
|-id=703 bgcolor=#fefefe
| 367703 ||  || — || August 29, 2006 || Kitt Peak || Spacewatch || V || align=right data-sort-value="0.66" | 660 m || 
|-id=704 bgcolor=#fefefe
| 367704 ||  || — || April 24, 2003 || Kitt Peak || Spacewatch || — || align=right data-sort-value="0.72" | 720 m || 
|-id=705 bgcolor=#fefefe
| 367705 ||  || — || November 4, 2007 || Kitt Peak || Spacewatch || FLO || align=right data-sort-value="0.60" | 600 m || 
|-id=706 bgcolor=#E9E9E9
| 367706 ||  || — || October 2, 2010 || Kitt Peak || Spacewatch || DOR || align=right | 2.4 km || 
|-id=707 bgcolor=#fefefe
| 367707 ||  || — || September 15, 2010 || Kitt Peak || Spacewatch || — || align=right data-sort-value="0.74" | 740 m || 
|-id=708 bgcolor=#FA8072
| 367708 ||  || — || August 24, 2000 || Socorro || LINEAR || — || align=right data-sort-value="0.79" | 790 m || 
|-id=709 bgcolor=#fefefe
| 367709 ||  || — || February 1, 2008 || Kitt Peak || Spacewatch || NYS || align=right data-sort-value="0.76" | 760 m || 
|-id=710 bgcolor=#fefefe
| 367710 ||  || — || September 30, 2003 || Kitt Peak || Spacewatch || — || align=right data-sort-value="0.84" | 840 m || 
|-id=711 bgcolor=#fefefe
| 367711 ||  || — || September 2, 2010 || Mount Lemmon || Mount Lemmon Survey || — || align=right data-sort-value="0.80" | 800 m || 
|-id=712 bgcolor=#fefefe
| 367712 ||  || — || October 31, 1999 || Kitt Peak || Spacewatch || MAS || align=right data-sort-value="0.69" | 690 m || 
|-id=713 bgcolor=#E9E9E9
| 367713 ||  || — || April 22, 2004 || Desert Eagle || W. K. Y. Yeung || — || align=right | 1.5 km || 
|-id=714 bgcolor=#fefefe
| 367714 ||  || — || September 10, 2010 || Kitt Peak || Spacewatch || — || align=right data-sort-value="0.74" | 740 m || 
|-id=715 bgcolor=#E9E9E9
| 367715 ||  || — || October 21, 2006 || Lulin || Lulin Obs. || — || align=right | 1.8 km || 
|-id=716 bgcolor=#fefefe
| 367716 ||  || — || November 5, 2007 || Mount Lemmon || Mount Lemmon Survey || — || align=right | 1.3 km || 
|-id=717 bgcolor=#fefefe
| 367717 ||  || — || October 9, 2010 || Catalina || CSS || — || align=right | 1.1 km || 
|-id=718 bgcolor=#fefefe
| 367718 ||  || — || December 19, 2003 || Kitt Peak || Spacewatch || — || align=right data-sort-value="0.88" | 880 m || 
|-id=719 bgcolor=#fefefe
| 367719 ||  || — || October 15, 2003 || Palomar || NEAT || — || align=right data-sort-value="0.78" | 780 m || 
|-id=720 bgcolor=#fefefe
| 367720 ||  || — || September 19, 2003 || Kitt Peak || Spacewatch || FLO || align=right data-sort-value="0.53" | 530 m || 
|-id=721 bgcolor=#fefefe
| 367721 ||  || — || October 19, 2003 || Kitt Peak || Spacewatch || NYS || align=right data-sort-value="0.74" | 740 m || 
|-id=722 bgcolor=#fefefe
| 367722 ||  || — || October 3, 2003 || Kitt Peak || Spacewatch || V || align=right data-sort-value="0.62" | 620 m || 
|-id=723 bgcolor=#fefefe
| 367723 ||  || — || September 22, 2003 || Kitt Peak || Spacewatch || — || align=right data-sort-value="0.98" | 980 m || 
|-id=724 bgcolor=#fefefe
| 367724 ||  || — || September 21, 2003 || Anderson Mesa || LONEOS || FLO || align=right data-sort-value="0.77" | 770 m || 
|-id=725 bgcolor=#fefefe
| 367725 ||  || — || March 22, 2009 || Mount Lemmon || Mount Lemmon Survey || NYS || align=right data-sort-value="0.87" | 870 m || 
|-id=726 bgcolor=#fefefe
| 367726 ||  || — || February 11, 2004 || Kitt Peak || Spacewatch || MAS || align=right data-sort-value="0.73" | 730 m || 
|-id=727 bgcolor=#fefefe
| 367727 ||  || — || September 25, 2003 || Haleakala || NEAT || — || align=right data-sort-value="0.75" | 750 m || 
|-id=728 bgcolor=#fefefe
| 367728 ||  || — || September 16, 2010 || Mount Lemmon || Mount Lemmon Survey || — || align=right data-sort-value="0.84" | 840 m || 
|-id=729 bgcolor=#fefefe
| 367729 ||  || — || August 20, 2006 || Palomar || NEAT || V || align=right data-sort-value="0.74" | 740 m || 
|-id=730 bgcolor=#fefefe
| 367730 ||  || — || September 15, 2006 || Kitt Peak || Spacewatch || NYS || align=right data-sort-value="0.68" | 680 m || 
|-id=731 bgcolor=#E9E9E9
| 367731 ||  || — || August 6, 2010 || WISE || WISE || — || align=right | 2.7 km || 
|-id=732 bgcolor=#fefefe
| 367732 Mikesimonsen ||  ||  || May 4, 2005 || Faulkes Telescope North || J. Bedient || V || align=right data-sort-value="0.62" | 620 m || 
|-id=733 bgcolor=#fefefe
| 367733 ||  || — || September 16, 2006 || Catalina || CSS || — || align=right | 1.1 km || 
|-id=734 bgcolor=#fefefe
| 367734 ||  || — || August 15, 2006 || Palomar || NEAT || — || align=right | 1.1 km || 
|-id=735 bgcolor=#fefefe
| 367735 ||  || — || February 7, 2008 || Kitt Peak || Spacewatch || MAS || align=right data-sort-value="0.82" | 820 m || 
|-id=736 bgcolor=#fefefe
| 367736 ||  || — || September 25, 2003 || Palomar || NEAT || — || align=right | 1.1 km || 
|-id=737 bgcolor=#fefefe
| 367737 ||  || — || October 20, 2003 || Socorro || LINEAR || FLO || align=right data-sort-value="0.87" | 870 m || 
|-id=738 bgcolor=#fefefe
| 367738 ||  || — || October 29, 2003 || Kitt Peak || Spacewatch || FLO || align=right data-sort-value="0.67" | 670 m || 
|-id=739 bgcolor=#fefefe
| 367739 ||  || — || September 5, 2002 || Apache Point || SDSS || — || align=right data-sort-value="0.89" | 890 m || 
|-id=740 bgcolor=#d6d6d6
| 367740 ||  || — || October 14, 2010 || Mount Lemmon || Mount Lemmon Survey || — || align=right | 5.3 km || 
|-id=741 bgcolor=#fefefe
| 367741 ||  || — || August 16, 2006 || Siding Spring || SSS || — || align=right data-sort-value="0.88" | 880 m || 
|-id=742 bgcolor=#fefefe
| 367742 ||  || — || October 4, 1996 || Kitt Peak || Spacewatch || — || align=right data-sort-value="0.80" | 800 m || 
|-id=743 bgcolor=#fefefe
| 367743 ||  || — || September 18, 2006 || Catalina || CSS || V || align=right data-sort-value="0.66" | 660 m || 
|-id=744 bgcolor=#fefefe
| 367744 ||  || — || April 10, 2005 || Mount Lemmon || Mount Lemmon Survey || — || align=right data-sort-value="0.93" | 930 m || 
|-id=745 bgcolor=#E9E9E9
| 367745 ||  || — || September 4, 1997 || Caussols || ODAS || — || align=right | 1.7 km || 
|-id=746 bgcolor=#E9E9E9
| 367746 ||  || — || November 6, 2010 || Mount Lemmon || Mount Lemmon Survey || HEN || align=right | 1.1 km || 
|-id=747 bgcolor=#E9E9E9
| 367747 ||  || — || November 5, 2010 || Kitt Peak || Spacewatch || — || align=right | 2.5 km || 
|-id=748 bgcolor=#d6d6d6
| 367748 ||  || — || April 12, 2002 || Kitt Peak || Spacewatch || — || align=right | 3.1 km || 
|-id=749 bgcolor=#E9E9E9
| 367749 ||  || — || October 27, 2006 || Catalina || CSS || — || align=right | 1.5 km || 
|-id=750 bgcolor=#fefefe
| 367750 ||  || — || June 18, 2006 || Palomar || NEAT || — || align=right data-sort-value="0.93" | 930 m || 
|-id=751 bgcolor=#d6d6d6
| 367751 ||  || — || October 6, 2005 || Mount Lemmon || Mount Lemmon Survey || TIR || align=right | 3.8 km || 
|-id=752 bgcolor=#E9E9E9
| 367752 ||  || — || September 11, 2010 || Mount Lemmon || Mount Lemmon Survey || — || align=right | 1.4 km || 
|-id=753 bgcolor=#fefefe
| 367753 ||  || — || August 16, 2006 || Palomar || NEAT || V || align=right data-sort-value="0.69" | 690 m || 
|-id=754 bgcolor=#d6d6d6
| 367754 ||  || — || October 30, 2010 || Kitt Peak || Spacewatch || — || align=right | 3.7 km || 
|-id=755 bgcolor=#E9E9E9
| 367755 ||  || — || November 18, 2006 || Kitt Peak || Spacewatch || — || align=right | 1.5 km || 
|-id=756 bgcolor=#E9E9E9
| 367756 ||  || — || October 30, 2010 || Mount Lemmon || Mount Lemmon Survey || — || align=right | 1.9 km || 
|-id=757 bgcolor=#E9E9E9
| 367757 ||  || — || October 4, 2006 || Mount Lemmon || Mount Lemmon Survey || — || align=right | 1.3 km || 
|-id=758 bgcolor=#d6d6d6
| 367758 ||  || — || September 30, 2005 || Mount Lemmon || Mount Lemmon Survey || KOR || align=right | 2.0 km || 
|-id=759 bgcolor=#fefefe
| 367759 ||  || — || September 27, 2006 || Catalina || CSS || V || align=right data-sort-value="0.71" | 710 m || 
|-id=760 bgcolor=#fefefe
| 367760 ||  || — || February 8, 2008 || Catalina || CSS || V || align=right data-sort-value="0.65" | 650 m || 
|-id=761 bgcolor=#E9E9E9
| 367761 ||  || — || October 11, 2010 || Mount Lemmon || Mount Lemmon Survey || — || align=right | 1.5 km || 
|-id=762 bgcolor=#E9E9E9
| 367762 ||  || — || June 28, 2005 || Kitt Peak || Spacewatch || — || align=right | 1.1 km || 
|-id=763 bgcolor=#fefefe
| 367763 ||  || — || May 10, 2005 || Cerro Tololo || M. W. Buie || — || align=right data-sort-value="0.91" | 910 m || 
|-id=764 bgcolor=#E9E9E9
| 367764 ||  || — || January 8, 2003 || Socorro || LINEAR || — || align=right | 1.2 km || 
|-id=765 bgcolor=#E9E9E9
| 367765 ||  || — || December 21, 2006 || Kitt Peak || Spacewatch || — || align=right | 2.8 km || 
|-id=766 bgcolor=#fefefe
| 367766 ||  || — || November 11, 2006 || Mount Lemmon || Mount Lemmon Survey || — || align=right data-sort-value="0.96" | 960 m || 
|-id=767 bgcolor=#fefefe
| 367767 ||  || — || November 5, 2003 || Anderson Mesa || LONEOS || — || align=right data-sort-value="0.84" | 840 m || 
|-id=768 bgcolor=#E9E9E9
| 367768 ||  || — || November 21, 2001 || Socorro || LINEAR || — || align=right | 3.0 km || 
|-id=769 bgcolor=#fefefe
| 367769 ||  || — || August 29, 2006 || Kitt Peak || Spacewatch || — || align=right data-sort-value="0.77" | 770 m || 
|-id=770 bgcolor=#fefefe
| 367770 ||  || — || September 30, 2006 || Mount Lemmon || Mount Lemmon Survey || — || align=right data-sort-value="0.87" | 870 m || 
|-id=771 bgcolor=#d6d6d6
| 367771 ||  || — || May 8, 2002 || Socorro || LINEAR || — || align=right | 4.2 km || 
|-id=772 bgcolor=#fefefe
| 367772 ||  || — || July 18, 2006 || Siding Spring || SSS || — || align=right data-sort-value="0.92" | 920 m || 
|-id=773 bgcolor=#E9E9E9
| 367773 ||  || — || October 30, 2010 || Kitt Peak || Spacewatch || — || align=right | 1.4 km || 
|-id=774 bgcolor=#E9E9E9
| 367774 ||  || — || November 21, 2006 || Mount Lemmon || Mount Lemmon Survey || JUN || align=right | 1.1 km || 
|-id=775 bgcolor=#d6d6d6
| 367775 ||  || — || January 6, 2006 || Kitt Peak || Spacewatch || EOS || align=right | 2.4 km || 
|-id=776 bgcolor=#fefefe
| 367776 ||  || — || February 2, 2008 || Mount Lemmon || Mount Lemmon Survey || — || align=right data-sort-value="0.79" | 790 m || 
|-id=777 bgcolor=#E9E9E9
| 367777 ||  || — || March 29, 2004 || Kitt Peak || Spacewatch || KON || align=right | 2.6 km || 
|-id=778 bgcolor=#E9E9E9
| 367778 ||  || — || November 28, 2006 || Vail-Jarnac || Jarnac Obs. || — || align=right | 1.4 km || 
|-id=779 bgcolor=#E9E9E9
| 367779 ||  || — || July 31, 2005 || Palomar || NEAT || — || align=right | 1.9 km || 
|-id=780 bgcolor=#E9E9E9
| 367780 ||  || — || June 11, 2004 || Kitt Peak || Spacewatch || — || align=right | 3.1 km || 
|-id=781 bgcolor=#fefefe
| 367781 ||  || — || October 12, 2006 || Palomar || NEAT || V || align=right data-sort-value="0.61" | 610 m || 
|-id=782 bgcolor=#E9E9E9
| 367782 ||  || — || November 19, 2006 || Kitt Peak || Spacewatch || — || align=right | 1.9 km || 
|-id=783 bgcolor=#E9E9E9
| 367783 ||  || — || November 5, 2005 || Catalina || CSS || HOF || align=right | 3.0 km || 
|-id=784 bgcolor=#E9E9E9
| 367784 ||  || — || September 30, 2005 || Mount Lemmon || Mount Lemmon Survey || GEF || align=right | 1.4 km || 
|-id=785 bgcolor=#fefefe
| 367785 ||  || — || October 16, 2006 || Catalina || CSS || — || align=right | 1.1 km || 
|-id=786 bgcolor=#d6d6d6
| 367786 ||  || — || November 1, 2005 || Mount Lemmon || Mount Lemmon Survey || — || align=right | 2.7 km || 
|-id=787 bgcolor=#E9E9E9
| 367787 ||  || — || December 12, 2006 || Mount Lemmon || Mount Lemmon Survey || — || align=right data-sort-value="0.90" | 900 m || 
|-id=788 bgcolor=#E9E9E9
| 367788 ||  || — || November 22, 2006 || Kitt Peak || Spacewatch || — || align=right | 1.3 km || 
|-id=789 bgcolor=#FFC2E0
| 367789 ||  || — || January 8, 2011 || Mount Lemmon || Mount Lemmon Survey || APOPHAcritical || align=right data-sort-value="0.15" | 150 m || 
|-id=790 bgcolor=#d6d6d6
| 367790 ||  || — || June 9, 2007 || Kitt Peak || Spacewatch || VER || align=right | 3.3 km || 
|-id=791 bgcolor=#d6d6d6
| 367791 ||  || — || December 27, 2005 || Kitt Peak || Spacewatch || — || align=right | 3.1 km || 
|-id=792 bgcolor=#d6d6d6
| 367792 ||  || — || January 18, 2010 || WISE || WISE || — || align=right | 5.5 km || 
|-id=793 bgcolor=#E9E9E9
| 367793 ||  || — || October 20, 1993 || Kitt Peak || Spacewatch || — || align=right | 1.2 km || 
|-id=794 bgcolor=#E9E9E9
| 367794 ||  || — || March 11, 2002 || Palomar || NEAT || HNA || align=right | 2.1 km || 
|-id=795 bgcolor=#d6d6d6
| 367795 ||  || — || January 7, 2006 || Mount Lemmon || Mount Lemmon Survey || — || align=right | 3.1 km || 
|-id=796 bgcolor=#E9E9E9
| 367796 ||  || — || April 3, 2008 || Mount Lemmon || Mount Lemmon Survey || — || align=right | 1.9 km || 
|-id=797 bgcolor=#E9E9E9
| 367797 ||  || — || September 27, 2001 || Anderson Mesa || LONEOS || EUN || align=right | 1.4 km || 
|-id=798 bgcolor=#E9E9E9
| 367798 ||  || — || July 4, 2005 || Kitt Peak || Spacewatch || — || align=right | 1.4 km || 
|-id=799 bgcolor=#d6d6d6
| 367799 ||  || — || October 21, 2009 || Mount Lemmon || Mount Lemmon Survey || EOS || align=right | 2.1 km || 
|-id=800 bgcolor=#d6d6d6
| 367800 ||  || — || December 8, 2010 || Mount Lemmon || Mount Lemmon Survey || — || align=right | 3.5 km || 
|}

367801–367900 

|-bgcolor=#E9E9E9
| 367801 ||  || — || August 29, 2005 || Palomar || NEAT || — || align=right | 1.9 km || 
|-id=802 bgcolor=#E9E9E9
| 367802 ||  || — || September 26, 2005 || Kitt Peak || Spacewatch || — || align=right | 1.4 km || 
|-id=803 bgcolor=#d6d6d6
| 367803 ||  || — || December 9, 2010 || Mount Lemmon || Mount Lemmon Survey || — || align=right | 2.7 km || 
|-id=804 bgcolor=#d6d6d6
| 367804 ||  || — || September 4, 2008 || Kitt Peak || Spacewatch || — || align=right | 4.5 km || 
|-id=805 bgcolor=#d6d6d6
| 367805 ||  || — || July 1, 2008 || Kitt Peak || Spacewatch || — || align=right | 3.4 km || 
|-id=806 bgcolor=#d6d6d6
| 367806 ||  || — || April 16, 2001 || Apache Point || SDSS || HYG || align=right | 2.3 km || 
|-id=807 bgcolor=#d6d6d6
| 367807 ||  || — || January 10, 2011 || Kitt Peak || Spacewatch || — || align=right | 3.6 km || 
|-id=808 bgcolor=#d6d6d6
| 367808 ||  || — || November 2, 2010 || Mount Lemmon || Mount Lemmon Survey || — || align=right | 4.5 km || 
|-id=809 bgcolor=#E9E9E9
| 367809 ||  || — || November 1, 2005 || Mount Lemmon || Mount Lemmon Survey || AEO || align=right | 1.4 km || 
|-id=810 bgcolor=#d6d6d6
| 367810 ||  || — || January 10, 2011 || Kitt Peak || Spacewatch || — || align=right | 2.8 km || 
|-id=811 bgcolor=#E9E9E9
| 367811 ||  || — || September 30, 2005 || Kitt Peak || Spacewatch || — || align=right | 1.4 km || 
|-id=812 bgcolor=#d6d6d6
| 367812 ||  || — || September 18, 2003 || Kitt Peak || Spacewatch || EOS || align=right | 2.0 km || 
|-id=813 bgcolor=#d6d6d6
| 367813 ||  || — || October 1, 2003 || Kitt Peak || Spacewatch || EOS || align=right | 2.4 km || 
|-id=814 bgcolor=#E9E9E9
| 367814 ||  || — || February 17, 2007 || Kitt Peak || Spacewatch || AGN || align=right | 1.3 km || 
|-id=815 bgcolor=#d6d6d6
| 367815 ||  || — || December 23, 2000 || Apache Point || SDSS || — || align=right | 3.6 km || 
|-id=816 bgcolor=#d6d6d6
| 367816 ||  || — || September 26, 2003 || Apache Point || SDSS || — || align=right | 2.9 km || 
|-id=817 bgcolor=#d6d6d6
| 367817 ||  || — || December 8, 2010 || Mount Lemmon || Mount Lemmon Survey || — || align=right | 3.7 km || 
|-id=818 bgcolor=#d6d6d6
| 367818 ||  || — || May 16, 2007 || Mount Lemmon || Mount Lemmon Survey || EOS || align=right | 2.4 km || 
|-id=819 bgcolor=#d6d6d6
| 367819 ||  || — || November 3, 2010 || Mount Lemmon || Mount Lemmon Survey || EOS || align=right | 2.5 km || 
|-id=820 bgcolor=#d6d6d6
| 367820 ||  || — || July 8, 2002 || Palomar || NEAT || — || align=right | 5.0 km || 
|-id=821 bgcolor=#E9E9E9
| 367821 ||  || — || August 21, 2004 || Siding Spring || SSS || NEM || align=right | 2.7 km || 
|-id=822 bgcolor=#E9E9E9
| 367822 ||  || — || August 31, 2005 || Palomar || NEAT || — || align=right | 1.5 km || 
|-id=823 bgcolor=#E9E9E9
| 367823 ||  || — || October 25, 2005 || Catalina || CSS || NEM || align=right | 2.4 km || 
|-id=824 bgcolor=#d6d6d6
| 367824 ||  || — || January 4, 2010 || Kitt Peak || Spacewatch || — || align=right | 4.1 km || 
|-id=825 bgcolor=#d6d6d6
| 367825 ||  || — || December 26, 2005 || Kitt Peak || Spacewatch || TRE || align=right | 3.1 km || 
|-id=826 bgcolor=#E9E9E9
| 367826 ||  || — || September 16, 2009 || Catalina || CSS || — || align=right | 3.6 km || 
|-id=827 bgcolor=#E9E9E9
| 367827 ||  || — || December 21, 2005 || Kitt Peak || Spacewatch || HOF || align=right | 2.6 km || 
|-id=828 bgcolor=#d6d6d6
| 367828 ||  || — || September 18, 2003 || Palomar || NEAT || — || align=right | 3.5 km || 
|-id=829 bgcolor=#d6d6d6
| 367829 ||  || — || January 30, 2000 || Socorro || LINEAR || TIR || align=right | 3.9 km || 
|-id=830 bgcolor=#d6d6d6
| 367830 ||  || — || October 5, 1996 || Kitt Peak || Spacewatch || — || align=right | 4.7 km || 
|-id=831 bgcolor=#E9E9E9
| 367831 ||  || — || August 12, 2001 || Palomar || NEAT || — || align=right | 1.2 km || 
|-id=832 bgcolor=#d6d6d6
| 367832 ||  || — || February 13, 2010 || WISE || WISE || — || align=right | 6.7 km || 
|-id=833 bgcolor=#d6d6d6
| 367833 ||  || — || February 7, 2006 || Kitt Peak || Spacewatch || — || align=right | 2.2 km || 
|-id=834 bgcolor=#E9E9E9
| 367834 ||  || — || February 6, 2002 || Kitt Peak || Spacewatch || — || align=right | 1.9 km || 
|-id=835 bgcolor=#d6d6d6
| 367835 ||  || — || January 29, 2010 || WISE || WISE || — || align=right | 3.8 km || 
|-id=836 bgcolor=#d6d6d6
| 367836 ||  || — || July 28, 2008 || Mount Lemmon || Mount Lemmon Survey || — || align=right | 3.7 km || 
|-id=837 bgcolor=#d6d6d6
| 367837 ||  || — || February 9, 2005 || Mount Lemmon || Mount Lemmon Survey || 7:4 || align=right | 3.3 km || 
|-id=838 bgcolor=#d6d6d6
| 367838 ||  || — || January 26, 2006 || Kitt Peak || Spacewatch || — || align=right | 3.2 km || 
|-id=839 bgcolor=#E9E9E9
| 367839 ||  || — || December 7, 2005 || Kitt Peak || Spacewatch || — || align=right | 2.2 km || 
|-id=840 bgcolor=#d6d6d6
| 367840 ||  || — || January 29, 2011 || Mount Lemmon || Mount Lemmon Survey || EOS || align=right | 2.1 km || 
|-id=841 bgcolor=#E9E9E9
| 367841 ||  || — || August 18, 2009 || Kitt Peak || Spacewatch || MRX || align=right | 1.2 km || 
|-id=842 bgcolor=#d6d6d6
| 367842 ||  || — || March 26, 2006 || Mount Lemmon || Mount Lemmon Survey || — || align=right | 2.8 km || 
|-id=843 bgcolor=#E9E9E9
| 367843 ||  || — || February 20, 2002 || Kitt Peak || Spacewatch || WIT || align=right | 1.3 km || 
|-id=844 bgcolor=#d6d6d6
| 367844 ||  || — || October 19, 2003 || Palomar || NEAT || — || align=right | 3.5 km || 
|-id=845 bgcolor=#d6d6d6
| 367845 ||  || — || September 22, 2003 || Kitt Peak || Spacewatch || — || align=right | 3.1 km || 
|-id=846 bgcolor=#d6d6d6
| 367846 ||  || — || January 9, 2000 || Kitt Peak || Spacewatch || EOS || align=right | 2.1 km || 
|-id=847 bgcolor=#d6d6d6
| 367847 ||  || — || December 10, 2005 || Kitt Peak || Spacewatch || — || align=right | 2.3 km || 
|-id=848 bgcolor=#d6d6d6
| 367848 ||  || — || February 14, 2010 || WISE || WISE || — || align=right | 4.8 km || 
|-id=849 bgcolor=#E9E9E9
| 367849 ||  || — || August 30, 2005 || Palomar || NEAT || — || align=right | 1.1 km || 
|-id=850 bgcolor=#d6d6d6
| 367850 ||  || — || November 12, 2005 || Kitt Peak || Spacewatch || NAE || align=right | 3.5 km || 
|-id=851 bgcolor=#d6d6d6
| 367851 ||  || — || December 10, 2010 || Mount Lemmon || Mount Lemmon Survey || — || align=right | 3.7 km || 
|-id=852 bgcolor=#d6d6d6
| 367852 ||  || — || October 1, 2003 || Kitt Peak || Spacewatch || EOS || align=right | 2.3 km || 
|-id=853 bgcolor=#d6d6d6
| 367853 ||  || — || October 8, 2008 || Mount Lemmon || Mount Lemmon Survey || 7:4 || align=right | 4.2 km || 
|-id=854 bgcolor=#d6d6d6
| 367854 ||  || — || August 7, 2008 || Kitt Peak || Spacewatch || EOS || align=right | 2.1 km || 
|-id=855 bgcolor=#E9E9E9
| 367855 ||  || — || October 13, 1993 || Kitt Peak || Spacewatch || — || align=right | 1.2 km || 
|-id=856 bgcolor=#d6d6d6
| 367856 ||  || — || September 28, 2008 || Catalina || CSS || — || align=right | 3.4 km || 
|-id=857 bgcolor=#d6d6d6
| 367857 ||  || — || September 20, 2003 || Kitt Peak || Spacewatch || — || align=right | 3.7 km || 
|-id=858 bgcolor=#d6d6d6
| 367858 ||  || — || December 11, 2004 || Kitt Peak || Spacewatch || — || align=right | 4.3 km || 
|-id=859 bgcolor=#d6d6d6
| 367859 ||  || — || February 5, 2000 || Kitt Peak || M. W. Buie || EOS || align=right | 2.0 km || 
|-id=860 bgcolor=#d6d6d6
| 367860 ||  || — || April 25, 2007 || Kitt Peak || Spacewatch || EOS || align=right | 2.3 km || 
|-id=861 bgcolor=#E9E9E9
| 367861 ||  || — || December 8, 2010 || Mount Lemmon || Mount Lemmon Survey || — || align=right | 3.2 km || 
|-id=862 bgcolor=#d6d6d6
| 367862 ||  || — || September 30, 2003 || Kitt Peak || Spacewatch || EOS || align=right | 2.2 km || 
|-id=863 bgcolor=#d6d6d6
| 367863 ||  || — || December 10, 2004 || Kitt Peak || Spacewatch || CRO || align=right | 3.6 km || 
|-id=864 bgcolor=#d6d6d6
| 367864 ||  || — || December 5, 2009 || Tzec Maun || Tzec Maun Obs. || EOS || align=right | 2.5 km || 
|-id=865 bgcolor=#d6d6d6
| 367865 ||  || — || January 26, 2006 || Mount Lemmon || Mount Lemmon Survey || TEL || align=right | 1.6 km || 
|-id=866 bgcolor=#d6d6d6
| 367866 ||  || — || March 5, 2006 || Kitt Peak || Spacewatch || — || align=right | 3.0 km || 
|-id=867 bgcolor=#d6d6d6
| 367867 ||  || — || March 5, 2006 || Kitt Peak || Spacewatch || — || align=right | 3.4 km || 
|-id=868 bgcolor=#d6d6d6
| 367868 ||  || — || September 19, 2003 || Palomar || NEAT || — || align=right | 3.0 km || 
|-id=869 bgcolor=#d6d6d6
| 367869 ||  || — || January 22, 2006 || Mount Lemmon || Mount Lemmon Survey || KOR || align=right | 1.5 km || 
|-id=870 bgcolor=#d6d6d6
| 367870 ||  || — || October 25, 2003 || Kitt Peak || Spacewatch || HYG || align=right | 3.0 km || 
|-id=871 bgcolor=#d6d6d6
| 367871 ||  || — || January 30, 2011 || Haleakala || Pan-STARRS || EOS || align=right | 2.2 km || 
|-id=872 bgcolor=#d6d6d6
| 367872 ||  || — || February 20, 2006 || Kitt Peak || Spacewatch || EOS || align=right | 1.8 km || 
|-id=873 bgcolor=#d6d6d6
| 367873 ||  || — || November 27, 2009 || Mount Lemmon || Mount Lemmon Survey || 7:4 || align=right | 4.7 km || 
|-id=874 bgcolor=#E9E9E9
| 367874 ||  || — || March 31, 2003 || Kitt Peak || Spacewatch || — || align=right | 1.1 km || 
|-id=875 bgcolor=#d6d6d6
| 367875 ||  || — || November 13, 2010 || Mount Lemmon || Mount Lemmon Survey || — || align=right | 3.5 km || 
|-id=876 bgcolor=#d6d6d6
| 367876 ||  || — || November 19, 2009 || Kitt Peak || Spacewatch || — || align=right | 3.1 km || 
|-id=877 bgcolor=#d6d6d6
| 367877 ||  || — || September 27, 2003 || Kitt Peak || Spacewatch || THM || align=right | 2.2 km || 
|-id=878 bgcolor=#d6d6d6
| 367878 ||  || — || September 6, 2008 || Mount Lemmon || Mount Lemmon Survey || THM || align=right | 2.7 km || 
|-id=879 bgcolor=#d6d6d6
| 367879 ||  || — || March 9, 2011 || Mount Lemmon || Mount Lemmon Survey || — || align=right | 3.7 km || 
|-id=880 bgcolor=#d6d6d6
| 367880 ||  || — || March 10, 2005 || Catalina || CSS || — || align=right | 3.6 km || 
|-id=881 bgcolor=#d6d6d6
| 367881 ||  || — || October 31, 2002 || Anderson Mesa || LONEOS || — || align=right | 5.9 km || 
|-id=882 bgcolor=#d6d6d6
| 367882 ||  || — || September 30, 2006 || Mount Lemmon || Mount Lemmon Survey || — || align=right | 3.4 km || 
|-id=883 bgcolor=#fefefe
| 367883 ||  || — || September 21, 2011 || Kitt Peak || Spacewatch || V || align=right data-sort-value="0.95" | 950 m || 
|-id=884 bgcolor=#fefefe
| 367884 ||  || — || May 9, 2005 || Anderson Mesa || LONEOS || H || align=right data-sort-value="0.93" | 930 m || 
|-id=885 bgcolor=#E9E9E9
| 367885 ||  || — || August 14, 2002 || Kitt Peak || Spacewatch || GAL || align=right | 1.5 km || 
|-id=886 bgcolor=#fefefe
| 367886 ||  || — || May 4, 2010 || Siding Spring || SSS || H || align=right data-sort-value="0.75" | 750 m || 
|-id=887 bgcolor=#fefefe
| 367887 ||  || — || October 6, 2004 || Kitt Peak || Spacewatch || — || align=right | 1.00 km || 
|-id=888 bgcolor=#fefefe
| 367888 ||  || — || September 11, 2007 || Kitt Peak || Spacewatch || — || align=right data-sort-value="0.88" | 880 m || 
|-id=889 bgcolor=#E9E9E9
| 367889 ||  || — || March 3, 2008 || Siding Spring || SSS || BAR || align=right | 1.6 km || 
|-id=890 bgcolor=#d6d6d6
| 367890 ||  || — || December 6, 2005 || Kitt Peak || Spacewatch || — || align=right | 3.4 km || 
|-id=891 bgcolor=#fefefe
| 367891 ||  || — || February 27, 2009 || Kitt Peak || Spacewatch || NYS || align=right data-sort-value="0.60" | 600 m || 
|-id=892 bgcolor=#fefefe
| 367892 ||  || — || December 19, 2007 || Kitt Peak || Spacewatch || NYS || align=right data-sort-value="0.84" | 840 m || 
|-id=893 bgcolor=#fefefe
| 367893 ||  || — || September 26, 2000 || Apache Point || SDSS || V || align=right data-sort-value="0.80" | 800 m || 
|-id=894 bgcolor=#fefefe
| 367894 ||  || — || March 3, 2005 || Kitt Peak || Spacewatch || — || align=right data-sort-value="0.91" | 910 m || 
|-id=895 bgcolor=#fefefe
| 367895 ||  || — || September 12, 2007 || Catalina || CSS || — || align=right data-sort-value="0.95" | 950 m || 
|-id=896 bgcolor=#fefefe
| 367896 ||  || — || March 14, 2005 || Mount Lemmon || Mount Lemmon Survey || — || align=right | 1.0 km || 
|-id=897 bgcolor=#fefefe
| 367897 ||  || — || December 12, 2004 || Kitt Peak || Spacewatch || V || align=right data-sort-value="0.79" | 790 m || 
|-id=898 bgcolor=#E9E9E9
| 367898 ||  || — || January 27, 2003 || Haleakala || NEAT || — || align=right | 2.3 km || 
|-id=899 bgcolor=#fefefe
| 367899 ||  || — || December 19, 2004 || Mount Lemmon || Mount Lemmon Survey || — || align=right data-sort-value="0.71" | 710 m || 
|-id=900 bgcolor=#fefefe
| 367900 ||  || — || January 16, 2005 || Desert Eagle || W. K. Y. Yeung || FLO || align=right data-sort-value="0.71" | 710 m || 
|}

367901–368000 

|-bgcolor=#E9E9E9
| 367901 ||  || — || May 8, 2008 || Siding Spring || SSS || — || align=right | 2.9 km || 
|-id=902 bgcolor=#fefefe
| 367902 ||  || — || May 18, 2002 || Palomar || NEAT || NYS || align=right data-sort-value="0.59" | 590 m || 
|-id=903 bgcolor=#fefefe
| 367903 ||  || — || April 21, 2009 || Kitt Peak || Spacewatch || MAS || align=right data-sort-value="0.72" | 720 m || 
|-id=904 bgcolor=#fefefe
| 367904 ||  || — || February 21, 2001 || Kitt Peak || Spacewatch || — || align=right data-sort-value="0.70" | 700 m || 
|-id=905 bgcolor=#d6d6d6
| 367905 ||  || — || October 30, 2005 || Mount Lemmon || Mount Lemmon Survey || — || align=right | 3.7 km || 
|-id=906 bgcolor=#E9E9E9
| 367906 ||  || — || April 9, 2003 || Palomar || NEAT || — || align=right | 2.8 km || 
|-id=907 bgcolor=#E9E9E9
| 367907 ||  || — || September 27, 2006 || Mount Lemmon || Mount Lemmon Survey || — || align=right | 1.7 km || 
|-id=908 bgcolor=#fefefe
| 367908 ||  || — || November 12, 2007 || Mount Lemmon || Mount Lemmon Survey || — || align=right | 1.1 km || 
|-id=909 bgcolor=#fefefe
| 367909 ||  || — || November 3, 2007 || Kitt Peak || Spacewatch || — || align=right data-sort-value="0.99" | 990 m || 
|-id=910 bgcolor=#fefefe
| 367910 ||  || — || December 20, 2004 || Mount Lemmon || Mount Lemmon Survey || NYS || align=right data-sort-value="0.81" | 810 m || 
|-id=911 bgcolor=#fefefe
| 367911 ||  || — || March 18, 2009 || Mount Lemmon || Mount Lemmon Survey || — || align=right data-sort-value="0.85" | 850 m || 
|-id=912 bgcolor=#fefefe
| 367912 ||  || — || September 16, 1998 || Kitt Peak || Spacewatch || — || align=right | 1.00 km || 
|-id=913 bgcolor=#fefefe
| 367913 ||  || — || January 17, 2005 || Socorro || LINEAR || FLO || align=right data-sort-value="0.74" | 740 m || 
|-id=914 bgcolor=#fefefe
| 367914 ||  || — || August 21, 2006 || Kitt Peak || Spacewatch || NYS || align=right data-sort-value="0.78" | 780 m || 
|-id=915 bgcolor=#E9E9E9
| 367915 ||  || — || September 29, 2005 || Kitt Peak || Spacewatch || MRX || align=right | 1.3 km || 
|-id=916 bgcolor=#fefefe
| 367916 ||  || — || September 18, 2003 || Palomar || NEAT || — || align=right data-sort-value="0.93" | 930 m || 
|-id=917 bgcolor=#E9E9E9
| 367917 ||  || — || March 11, 2003 || Palomar || NEAT || MRX || align=right | 1.1 km || 
|-id=918 bgcolor=#fefefe
| 367918 ||  || — || December 30, 2007 || Kitt Peak || Spacewatch || — || align=right data-sort-value="0.89" | 890 m || 
|-id=919 bgcolor=#fefefe
| 367919 ||  || — || September 19, 2003 || Palomar || NEAT || V || align=right data-sort-value="0.82" | 820 m || 
|-id=920 bgcolor=#d6d6d6
| 367920 ||  || — || February 23, 2007 || Catalina || CSS || — || align=right | 3.2 km || 
|-id=921 bgcolor=#E9E9E9
| 367921 ||  || — || March 31, 2008 || Mount Lemmon || Mount Lemmon Survey || — || align=right | 2.3 km || 
|-id=922 bgcolor=#E9E9E9
| 367922 ||  || — || February 4, 2003 || Haleakala || NEAT || — || align=right | 3.6 km || 
|-id=923 bgcolor=#fefefe
| 367923 ||  || — || October 3, 2006 || Mount Lemmon || Mount Lemmon Survey || — || align=right | 1.0 km || 
|-id=924 bgcolor=#E9E9E9
| 367924 ||  || — || February 16, 2004 || Kitt Peak || Spacewatch || — || align=right | 1.2 km || 
|-id=925 bgcolor=#fefefe
| 367925 ||  || — || September 15, 2006 || Kitt Peak || Spacewatch || V || align=right data-sort-value="0.86" | 860 m || 
|-id=926 bgcolor=#fefefe
| 367926 ||  || — || September 24, 2003 || Palomar || NEAT || V || align=right data-sort-value="0.83" | 830 m || 
|-id=927 bgcolor=#fefefe
| 367927 ||  || — || November 26, 2003 || Kitt Peak || Spacewatch || V || align=right data-sort-value="0.79" | 790 m || 
|-id=928 bgcolor=#E9E9E9
| 367928 ||  || — || September 3, 2010 || Mount Lemmon || Mount Lemmon Survey || HOF || align=right | 2.5 km || 
|-id=929 bgcolor=#E9E9E9
| 367929 ||  || — || May 16, 2004 || Siding Spring || SSS || JUN || align=right | 1.6 km || 
|-id=930 bgcolor=#E9E9E9
| 367930 ||  || — || July 2, 2005 || Kitt Peak || Spacewatch || — || align=right | 1.1 km || 
|-id=931 bgcolor=#fefefe
| 367931 ||  || — || May 14, 2005 || Kitt Peak || Spacewatch || — || align=right data-sort-value="0.95" | 950 m || 
|-id=932 bgcolor=#fefefe
| 367932 ||  || — || January 15, 2005 || Kitt Peak || Spacewatch || V || align=right data-sort-value="0.68" | 680 m || 
|-id=933 bgcolor=#fefefe
| 367933 ||  || — || March 13, 2005 || Kitt Peak || Spacewatch || NYS || align=right data-sort-value="0.60" | 600 m || 
|-id=934 bgcolor=#E9E9E9
| 367934 ||  || — || March 28, 2008 || Mount Lemmon || Mount Lemmon Survey || — || align=right | 2.0 km || 
|-id=935 bgcolor=#d6d6d6
| 367935 ||  || — || December 21, 2005 || Kitt Peak || Spacewatch || — || align=right | 2.5 km || 
|-id=936 bgcolor=#fefefe
| 367936 ||  || — || May 10, 2005 || Kitt Peak || Spacewatch || — || align=right data-sort-value="0.81" | 810 m || 
|-id=937 bgcolor=#E9E9E9
| 367937 ||  || — || March 10, 2003 || Anderson Mesa || LONEOS || — || align=right | 2.3 km || 
|-id=938 bgcolor=#E9E9E9
| 367938 ||  || — || September 26, 2006 || Mount Lemmon || Mount Lemmon Survey || — || align=right data-sort-value="0.93" | 930 m || 
|-id=939 bgcolor=#d6d6d6
| 367939 ||  || — || May 14, 2002 || Kitt Peak || Spacewatch || — || align=right | 3.3 km || 
|-id=940 bgcolor=#E9E9E9
| 367940 ||  || — || April 7, 2003 || Kitt Peak || Spacewatch || — || align=right | 2.2 km || 
|-id=941 bgcolor=#d6d6d6
| 367941 ||  || — || April 8, 2002 || Palomar || NEAT || — || align=right | 3.2 km || 
|-id=942 bgcolor=#d6d6d6
| 367942 ||  || — || August 20, 2009 || Kitt Peak || Spacewatch || HYG || align=right | 3.1 km || 
|-id=943 bgcolor=#FFC2E0
| 367943 Duende ||  ||  || February 23, 2012 || OAM || OAM Obs. || ATEcritical || align=right data-sort-value="0.056" | 56 m || 
|-id=944 bgcolor=#fefefe
| 367944 ||  || — || November 15, 2003 || Kitt Peak || Spacewatch || — || align=right data-sort-value="0.77" | 770 m || 
|-id=945 bgcolor=#fefefe
| 367945 ||  || — || April 16, 2005 || Kitt Peak || Spacewatch || — || align=right data-sort-value="0.96" | 960 m || 
|-id=946 bgcolor=#fefefe
| 367946 ||  || — || November 25, 2006 || Catalina || CSS || V || align=right | 1.1 km || 
|-id=947 bgcolor=#d6d6d6
| 367947 ||  || — || March 26, 2001 || Kitt Peak || Spacewatch || — || align=right | 2.8 km || 
|-id=948 bgcolor=#E9E9E9
| 367948 ||  || — || September 29, 2005 || Mount Lemmon || Mount Lemmon Survey || HEN || align=right | 1.2 km || 
|-id=949 bgcolor=#fefefe
| 367949 ||  || — || December 14, 2001 || Kitt Peak || Spacewatch || FLO || align=right data-sort-value="0.55" | 550 m || 
|-id=950 bgcolor=#fefefe
| 367950 ||  || — || March 3, 2005 || Catalina || CSS || — || align=right data-sort-value="0.79" | 790 m || 
|-id=951 bgcolor=#E9E9E9
| 367951 ||  || — || October 10, 2005 || Catalina || CSS || — || align=right | 1.8 km || 
|-id=952 bgcolor=#d6d6d6
| 367952 ||  || — || March 4, 2006 || Mount Lemmon || Mount Lemmon Survey || 7:4 || align=right | 3.7 km || 
|-id=953 bgcolor=#fefefe
| 367953 ||  || — || February 9, 2005 || Kitt Peak || Spacewatch || — || align=right data-sort-value="0.66" | 660 m || 
|-id=954 bgcolor=#fefefe
| 367954 ||  || — || March 10, 2005 || Mount Lemmon || Mount Lemmon Survey || — || align=right data-sort-value="0.67" | 670 m || 
|-id=955 bgcolor=#fefefe
| 367955 ||  || — || December 31, 2007 || Mount Lemmon || Mount Lemmon Survey || — || align=right data-sort-value="0.79" | 790 m || 
|-id=956 bgcolor=#fefefe
| 367956 ||  || — || December 1, 2003 || Kitt Peak || Spacewatch || MAS || align=right data-sort-value="0.81" | 810 m || 
|-id=957 bgcolor=#E9E9E9
| 367957 ||  || — || October 1, 2000 || Socorro || LINEAR || — || align=right | 2.7 km || 
|-id=958 bgcolor=#fefefe
| 367958 ||  || — || March 4, 2005 || Mount Lemmon || Mount Lemmon Survey || — || align=right data-sort-value="0.86" | 860 m || 
|-id=959 bgcolor=#fefefe
| 367959 ||  || — || November 8, 2007 || Kitt Peak || Spacewatch || FLO || align=right data-sort-value="0.67" | 670 m || 
|-id=960 bgcolor=#d6d6d6
| 367960 ||  || — || January 19, 2012 || Haleakala || Pan-STARRS || — || align=right | 3.5 km || 
|-id=961 bgcolor=#d6d6d6
| 367961 ||  || — || March 19, 2001 || Haleakala || NEAT || — || align=right | 4.4 km || 
|-id=962 bgcolor=#d6d6d6
| 367962 ||  || — || February 12, 2002 || Socorro || LINEAR || — || align=right | 3.5 km || 
|-id=963 bgcolor=#d6d6d6
| 367963 ||  || — || January 26, 2001 || Kitt Peak || Spacewatch || — || align=right | 3.2 km || 
|-id=964 bgcolor=#d6d6d6
| 367964 ||  || — || September 29, 2009 || Mount Lemmon || Mount Lemmon Survey || — || align=right | 3.7 km || 
|-id=965 bgcolor=#d6d6d6
| 367965 ||  || — || April 2, 2006 || Mount Lemmon || Mount Lemmon Survey || LIX || align=right | 4.2 km || 
|-id=966 bgcolor=#d6d6d6
| 367966 ||  || — || September 4, 2003 || Kitt Peak || Spacewatch || — || align=right | 2.6 km || 
|-id=967 bgcolor=#E9E9E9
| 367967 ||  || — || November 1, 2005 || Kitt Peak || Spacewatch || — || align=right | 2.5 km || 
|-id=968 bgcolor=#E9E9E9
| 367968 ||  || — || November 17, 2006 || Mount Lemmon || Mount Lemmon Survey || — || align=right | 1.3 km || 
|-id=969 bgcolor=#d6d6d6
| 367969 ||  || — || December 27, 2005 || Kitt Peak || Spacewatch || — || align=right | 3.7 km || 
|-id=970 bgcolor=#d6d6d6
| 367970 ||  || — || February 8, 2002 || Kitt Peak || Spacewatch || CHA || align=right | 1.8 km || 
|-id=971 bgcolor=#fefefe
| 367971 ||  || — || December 19, 1995 || Kitt Peak || Spacewatch || — || align=right data-sort-value="0.87" | 870 m || 
|-id=972 bgcolor=#d6d6d6
| 367972 ||  || — || March 1, 1995 || Kitt Peak || Spacewatch || TIR || align=right | 3.7 km || 
|-id=973 bgcolor=#E9E9E9
| 367973 ||  || — || June 19, 2004 || Kitt Peak || Spacewatch || — || align=right | 2.1 km || 
|-id=974 bgcolor=#d6d6d6
| 367974 ||  || — || September 16, 2009 || Catalina || CSS || NAE || align=right | 3.9 km || 
|-id=975 bgcolor=#d6d6d6
| 367975 ||  || — || September 16, 2003 || Kitt Peak || Spacewatch || — || align=right | 3.9 km || 
|-id=976 bgcolor=#d6d6d6
| 367976 ||  || — || August 28, 2009 || Kitt Peak || Spacewatch || — || align=right | 3.0 km || 
|-id=977 bgcolor=#fefefe
| 367977 ||  || — || January 14, 2008 || Kitt Peak || Spacewatch || V || align=right data-sort-value="0.84" | 840 m || 
|-id=978 bgcolor=#d6d6d6
| 367978 ||  || — || March 11, 2002 || Palomar || NEAT || CHA || align=right | 2.9 km || 
|-id=979 bgcolor=#E9E9E9
| 367979 ||  || — || December 27, 2006 || Mount Lemmon || Mount Lemmon Survey || — || align=right | 2.5 km || 
|-id=980 bgcolor=#d6d6d6
| 367980 ||  || — || April 11, 2007 || Catalina || CSS || — || align=right | 3.2 km || 
|-id=981 bgcolor=#E9E9E9
| 367981 ||  || — || March 23, 2003 || Apache Point || SDSS || NEM || align=right | 3.1 km || 
|-id=982 bgcolor=#d6d6d6
| 367982 ||  || — || August 22, 2003 || Palomar || NEAT || — || align=right | 3.5 km || 
|-id=983 bgcolor=#E9E9E9
| 367983 ||  || — || October 8, 2005 || Kitt Peak || Spacewatch || — || align=right | 2.0 km || 
|-id=984 bgcolor=#d6d6d6
| 367984 ||  || — || March 2, 1995 || Kitt Peak || Spacewatch || EUP || align=right | 3.6 km || 
|-id=985 bgcolor=#E9E9E9
| 367985 ||  || — || March 27, 2008 || Mount Lemmon || Mount Lemmon Survey || — || align=right data-sort-value="0.95" | 950 m || 
|-id=986 bgcolor=#d6d6d6
| 367986 ||  || — || July 15, 2002 || Palomar || NEAT || — || align=right | 3.5 km || 
|-id=987 bgcolor=#E9E9E9
| 367987 ||  || — || November 17, 2006 || Mount Lemmon || Mount Lemmon Survey || — || align=right | 2.0 km || 
|-id=988 bgcolor=#E9E9E9
| 367988 ||  || — || March 2, 1995 || Kitt Peak || Spacewatch || — || align=right | 1.8 km || 
|-id=989 bgcolor=#d6d6d6
| 367989 ||  || — || March 10, 2007 || Mount Lemmon || Mount Lemmon Survey || — || align=right | 2.9 km || 
|-id=990 bgcolor=#E9E9E9
| 367990 ||  || — || July 30, 2005 || Palomar || NEAT || — || align=right | 1.5 km || 
|-id=991 bgcolor=#fefefe
| 367991 ||  || — || May 29, 2005 || Campo Imperatore || CINEOS || — || align=right | 1.5 km || 
|-id=992 bgcolor=#E9E9E9
| 367992 ||  || — || October 23, 2006 || Mount Lemmon || Mount Lemmon Survey || — || align=right | 1.6 km || 
|-id=993 bgcolor=#d6d6d6
| 367993 ||  || — || November 17, 2009 || Mount Lemmon || Mount Lemmon Survey || HYG || align=right | 3.1 km || 
|-id=994 bgcolor=#E9E9E9
| 367994 ||  || — || October 25, 2005 || Mount Lemmon || Mount Lemmon Survey || AGN || align=right | 1.4 km || 
|-id=995 bgcolor=#E9E9E9
| 367995 ||  || — || November 16, 2006 || Kitt Peak || Spacewatch || — || align=right | 1.6 km || 
|-id=996 bgcolor=#E9E9E9
| 367996 ||  || — || March 24, 2003 || Kitt Peak || Spacewatch || — || align=right | 2.6 km || 
|-id=997 bgcolor=#E9E9E9
| 367997 ||  || — || May 30, 2008 || Mount Lemmon || Mount Lemmon Survey || AEO || align=right | 1.2 km || 
|-id=998 bgcolor=#E9E9E9
| 367998 ||  || — || December 8, 2010 || Kitt Peak || Spacewatch || DOR || align=right | 2.7 km || 
|-id=999 bgcolor=#fefefe
| 367999 ||  || — || January 1, 2008 || Kitt Peak || Spacewatch || EUT || align=right data-sort-value="0.58" | 580 m || 
|-id=000 bgcolor=#d6d6d6
| 368000 ||  || — || December 4, 2011 || Haleakala || Pan-STARRS || HYG || align=right | 3.1 km || 
|}

References

External links 
 Discovery Circumstances: Numbered Minor Planets (365001)–(370000) (IAU Minor Planet Center)

0367